= Fluctuation =

Fluctuation may refer to:

== Physics and mathematics ==
- Statistical fluctuations, in statistics, statistical mechanics, and thermodynamics
  - Thermal fluctuations, statistical fluctuations in a thermodynamic variable
- Quantum fluctuation, arising from the uncertainty principle
  - Primordial fluctuations, density variations in the early universe
  - Universal conductance fluctuations, a quantum physics phenomenon encountered in electrical transport experiments in mesoscopic species

== Finance and economics ==
- Economic conjuncture, a critical combination of events in economics
- Volatility (finance), price fluctuation
