= H-stable potential =

Type of potential for a many-body system

In statistical mechanics of continuous systems, a potential for a many-body system is called H-stable (or simply stable) if the potential energy per particle is bounded below by a constant that is independent of the total number of particles. In many circumstances, if a potential is not H-stable, it is not possible to define a grand canonical partition function in finite volume, because of catastrophic configurations with infinite particles located in a finite space.

== Classical statistical mechanics ==
=== Definition ===
Consider a system of particles in positions $x_1, x_2,\ldots \in R^\nu$; the interaction or potential between a particle in position $x_i$ and a particle in position $x_j$ is

$$\phi(x_i-x_j) \,$$

where $\phi(x)$ is a real, even (possibly unbounded) function. Then $\phi(x)$ is H-stable if there exists $B>0$ such that, for any $n\ge1$ and any $x_1, x_2,\ldots, x_n\in R^\nu$,

$$V_n(x_1, x_2,\ldots x_n):=\sum_{i<j=1}^n  \phi(x_i-x_j)\ge-Bn\,$$

=== Applications ===
- If $\phi(0)<\infty$ and, for every $n\ge 1$ and every $x_1, x_2,\ldots x_n\in R^\nu$, it holds

$$\sum_{i,j=1}^n  \phi(x_i-x_j)\ge0$$

then the potential $\phi(x)$ is stable (with the constant $B$ given by $\frac{\phi(0)}{2}$). This condition applies for example to potentials that are: a) positive functions; b) positive-definite functions.

- If the potential $\phi(x)$ is stable, then, for any bounded domain $\Lambda$, any $\beta>0$ and $z>0$, the series

$$\sum_{n\ge 1}\frac{z^n}{n!}
\int_{\Lambda^n}\!dx_1\cdots dx_n\;
\exp[-\beta V_n(x_1, x_2,\ldots x_n)]$$

is convergent. In fact, for bounded, upper-semi-continuous potentials the hypothesis is not only sufficient, but also necessary!

- The grand canonical partition function, in finite volume, is

$$\Xi(\beta, z, \Lambda):=1+\sum_{n\ge 1}\frac{z^n}{n!}
\int_{\Lambda^n}\!dx_1\cdots dx_n\;
\exp[-\beta V_n(x_1, x_2,\ldots x_n)]$$

hence the H-stability is a sufficient condition for the partition function to exists in finite volume.

- H-stability doesn't necessary imply the existence of the infinite volume pressure. For example, in a Coulomb system (in dimension three) the potential is

$$\phi(x)=\frac{1}{4\pi|x|}$$

and, if the charges of all the particles are equal, then the potential energy is

$$V_n(x_1,\ldots, x_n)=\sum_{i<j} \phi(x_i-x_j)$$

and the system is H-stable with $B=0$; but the thermodynamic limit doesn't exist, because the potential is not tempered.

- If the potential is not bounded, H-stability is not a necessary condition for the existence of the grand canonical partition function in finite volume. For example, in the case of Yukawa interaction in two dimensions,

$$\phi(x)\sim-\frac{1}{2\pi}\ln{m|x|} \qquad
{\rm for}\quad x\sim 0$$

if the particles can have charges with different signs, the potential energy is

$$H_n(\underline q, \underline x)=\sum_{i<j} q_i q_j\phi(x_i-x_j)$$

where $q_j$ is the charge of the particle $j$. $H_n(\underline q, \underline x)$ in not bounded from below: for example, when $n=2$ and $q_1q_2=1$, the two body potential has infimum

$$\inf_{x_1, x_2}  \phi(x_1-x_2)=-\infty$$

Yet, Frohlich proved the existence of the thermodynamics limit for $\beta< 4\pi$.

== Quantum statistical mechanics ==
The notion of H-stability in quantum mechanics is more subtle. While in the classical case the kinetic part of the Hamiltonian is not important as it can be zero independently of the position of the particles, in the quantum case the kinetic term plays an important role in the lower bound for the total energy because of the uncertainty principle. (In fact, stability of matter was the historical reason for introducing such a principle in mechanics.) The definition of stability is :

$$\exists B: \frac{E_0}{N} > -B, \,$$

where E_{0} is the ground state energy.

Classical H-stability implies quantum H-stability, but the converse is false.

The criterion is especially useful in statistical mechanics, where H-stability is necessary to the existence of thermodynamics, i.e. if a system is not H-stable, the thermodynamic limit does not exist.
