= Isoenthalpic–isobaric ensemble =

Statistical-mechanical ensemble

The isoenthalpic-isobaric ensemble (constant enthalpy and constant pressure ensemble) is a statistical mechanical ensemble that maintains constant enthalpy $H \,$ and constant pressure $P \,$ applied. It is also called the $NPH$-ensemble, where the number of particles $N \,$ is also kept as a constant. It was developed by physicist H. C. Andersen in 1980. The ensemble adds another degree of freedom, which represents the variable volume $V \,$ of a system to which the coordinates of all particles are relative. The volume $V \,$ becomes a dynamical variable with potential energy and kinetic energy given by $PV \,$. The enthalpy $H=E+PV \,$ is a conserved quantity. Using the isoenthalpic-isobaric ensemble of the Lennard-Jones fluid, it was shown that the Joule–Thomson coefficient and inversion curve can be computed directly from a single molecular dynamics simulation. A complete vapor-compression refrigeration cycle and a vapor–liquid coexistence curve, as well as a reasonable estimate of the supercritical point can be also simulated from this approach. NPH simulation can be carried out using GROMACS and LAMMPS.
