= Grand potential =

Thermodynamic potential used in statistical mechanics

The grand potential or Landau potential or Landau free energy is a quantity used in statistical mechanics, especially for irreversible processes in open systems. The grand potential is the characteristic state function for the grand canonical ensemble.

== Definition ==
The grand potential is defined by
$$\Phi_\text{G} \stackrel{\mathrm{def}}{{}={}} U - T S - \mu N$$
where U is the internal energy, T is the temperature of the system, S is the entropy, μ is the chemical potential, and N is the number of particles in the system.

The change in the grand potential is given by
$$\begin{align}
\mathrm{d}\Phi_\mathrm{G} & = dU - T\,dS - S\,dT - \mu d\,N - N\,d\mu \\
& = - P\,dV - S\,dT - N\,d\mu
\end{align}$$
where P is pressure and V is volume, using the fundamental thermodynamic relation (combined first and second thermodynamic laws);
$$\mathrm{d}U = T\,dS - P\,dV + \mu\,dN$$
When the system is in thermodynamic equilibrium, $\Phi_\text{G}$ is at a minimum. This can be seen by considering that $\mathrm{d}\Phi_\mathrm{G}$ is zero if the volume is fixed and the temperature and chemical potential have stopped evolving.

=== Landau free energy ===
Some authors refer to the grand potential as the Landau free energy or Landau potential and mark it as $\Omega$, named after Russian physicist Lev Landau.

== Homogeneous systems (vs. inhomogeneous systems) ==
In the case of a scale-invariant type of system (where a system of volume $\lambda V$ has exactly the same set of microstates as $\lambda$ systems of volume $V$), then when the system expands new particles and energy will flow in from the reservoir to fill the new volume with a homogeneous extension of the original system. The pressure, then, must be constant with respect to changes in volume:
$$\left(\frac{\partial \langle P \rangle}{\partial V}\right)_{\mu,T} = 0,$$
and all extensive quantities (particle number, energy, entropy, potentials, ...) must grow linearly with volume, e.g.
$$\left(\frac{\partial \langle N \rangle}{\partial V}\right)_{\mu,T} = \frac{N}{V}.$$
In this case we simply have $\Phi_\text{G} = - \langle P\rangle V$, as well as the familiar relationship $G = \langle N \rangle \mu$ for the Gibbs free energy. The value of $\Phi_\text{G}$ can be understood as the work that can be extracted from the system by shrinking it down to nothing (putting all the particles and energy back into the reservoir). The fact that $\Phi_\text{G} = - \langle P\rangle V$ is negative implies that the extraction of particles from the system to the reservoir requires energy input.

Such homogeneous scaling does not exist in many systems. For example, when analyzing the ensemble of electrons in a single molecule or even a piece of metal floating in space, doubling the volume of the space does double the number of electrons in the material. The problem here is that, although electrons and energy are exchanged with a reservoir, the material host is not allowed to change. Generally in small systems, or systems with long range interactions (those outside the thermodynamic limit), $\Phi_\text{G} \neq - \langle P\rangle V$.

== See also ==
- Gibbs energy
- Helmholtz energy
