= Statistical fluctuations =

Statistical fluctuations are fluctuations in quantities derived from many identical random processes. They are fundamental and unavoidable. It can be proved that the relative fluctuations reduce as the square root of the number of identical processes.

Statistical fluctuations are responsible for many results of statistical mechanics and thermodynamics, including phenomena such as shot noise in electronics.

== Description ==
When a number of random processes occur, it can be shown that the outcomes fluctuate (vary in time) and that the fluctuations are inversely proportional to the square root of the number of processes. The average of fluctuations over a statistical ensemble is always zero as they are defined as deviations from the mean.

== Metrics ==
To characterize the intensity of fluctuations, several statistical measures are used. The Variance is the most common measure of fluctuation intensity. It's defined as the average of the squared deviations from the mean. The Root Mean Square (RMS) fluctuation: This is the square root of the variance and provides a measure of the typical magnitude of fluctuations.

== Examples ==
As an example that will be familiar to all, if a fair coin is tossed many times and the number of heads and tails counted, the ratio of heads to tails will be very close to 1 (about as many heads as tails); but after only a few throws, outcomes with a significant excess of heads over tails or vice versa are common; if an experiment with a few throws is repeated over and over, the outcomes will fluctuate a lot.

An electric current so small that not many electrons are involved flowing through a p-n junction is susceptible to statistical fluctuations as the actual number of electrons per unit time (the current) will fluctuate; this produces detectable and unavoidable electrical noise known as shot noise.

== See also ==
- Primordial fluctuations
- Quantum fluctuation
- Thermal fluctuations
- Universal conductance fluctuations
