= Statistical mechanics =

Physics of many interacting particles

In physics, statistical mechanics is a mathematical framework that applies statistical methods and probability theory to large assemblies of microscopic entities. Sometimes called statistical physics or statistical thermodynamics, its applications include many problems in a wide variety of fields such as biology, neuroscience, computer science, information theory and sociology. Its main purpose is to clarify the properties of matter in aggregate, in terms of physical laws governing atomic motion.

Statistical mechanics arose out of the development of classical thermodynamics, a field for which it was successful in explaining macroscopic physical properties—such as temperature, pressure, and heat capacity—in terms of microscopic parameters that fluctuate about average values and are characterized by probability distributions.

While classical thermodynamics is primarily concerned with thermodynamic equilibrium, statistical mechanics has been applied in non-equilibrium statistical mechanics to the issues of microscopically modeling the speed of irreversible processes that are driven by imbalances. Examples of such processes include chemical reactions and flows of particles and heat. The fluctuation–dissipation theorem is the basic knowledge obtained from applying non-equilibrium statistical mechanics to study the simplest non-equilibrium situation of a steady state current flow in a system of many particles.

== History ==
Ludwig Boltzmann, who spent much of his life studying statistical mechanics, died in 1906, by his own hand. Paul Ehrenfest, carrying on his work, died similarly in 1933. Now it is our turn to study statistical mechanics.

— David L. Goodstein, States of Matter

In 1738, Swiss physicist and mathematician Daniel Bernoulli published Hydrodynamica which laid the basis for the kinetic theory of gases. In this work, Bernoulli posited the argument, still used to this day, that gases consist of great numbers of molecules moving in all directions, that their impact on a surface causes the gas pressure that we feel, and that what we experience as heat is simply the kinetic energy of their motion.

The founding of the field of statistical mechanics is generally credited to three physicists:

- Ludwig Boltzmann, who developed the fundamental interpretation of entropy in terms of a collection of microstates
- James Clerk Maxwell, who developed models of probability distribution of such states
- Josiah Willard Gibbs, who coined the name of the field in 1884

In 1859, after reading a paper on the diffusion of molecules by Rudolf Clausius, the Scottish physicist Maxwell formulated the Maxwell distribution of molecular velocities, which gave the proportion of molecules having a certain velocity in a specific range. This was the first-ever statistical law in physics. Maxwell also gave the first mechanical argument that molecular collisions entail an equalization of temperatures and hence a tendency towards equilibrium. Five years later, in 1864, Boltzmann, a young student in Vienna, came across Maxwell's paper and spent much of his life developing the subject further.

Statistical mechanics was initiated in the 1870s with the work of Boltzmann, much of which was collectively published in his 1896 Lectures on Gas Theory. Boltzmann's original papers on the statistical interpretation of thermodynamics, the H-theorem, transport theory, thermal equilibrium, the equation of state of gases, and similar subjects, occupy about 2,000 pages in the proceedings of the Vienna Academy and other societies. Boltzmann introduced the concept of an equilibrium statistical ensemble and also investigated for the first time non-equilibrium statistical mechanics, with his H-theorem.

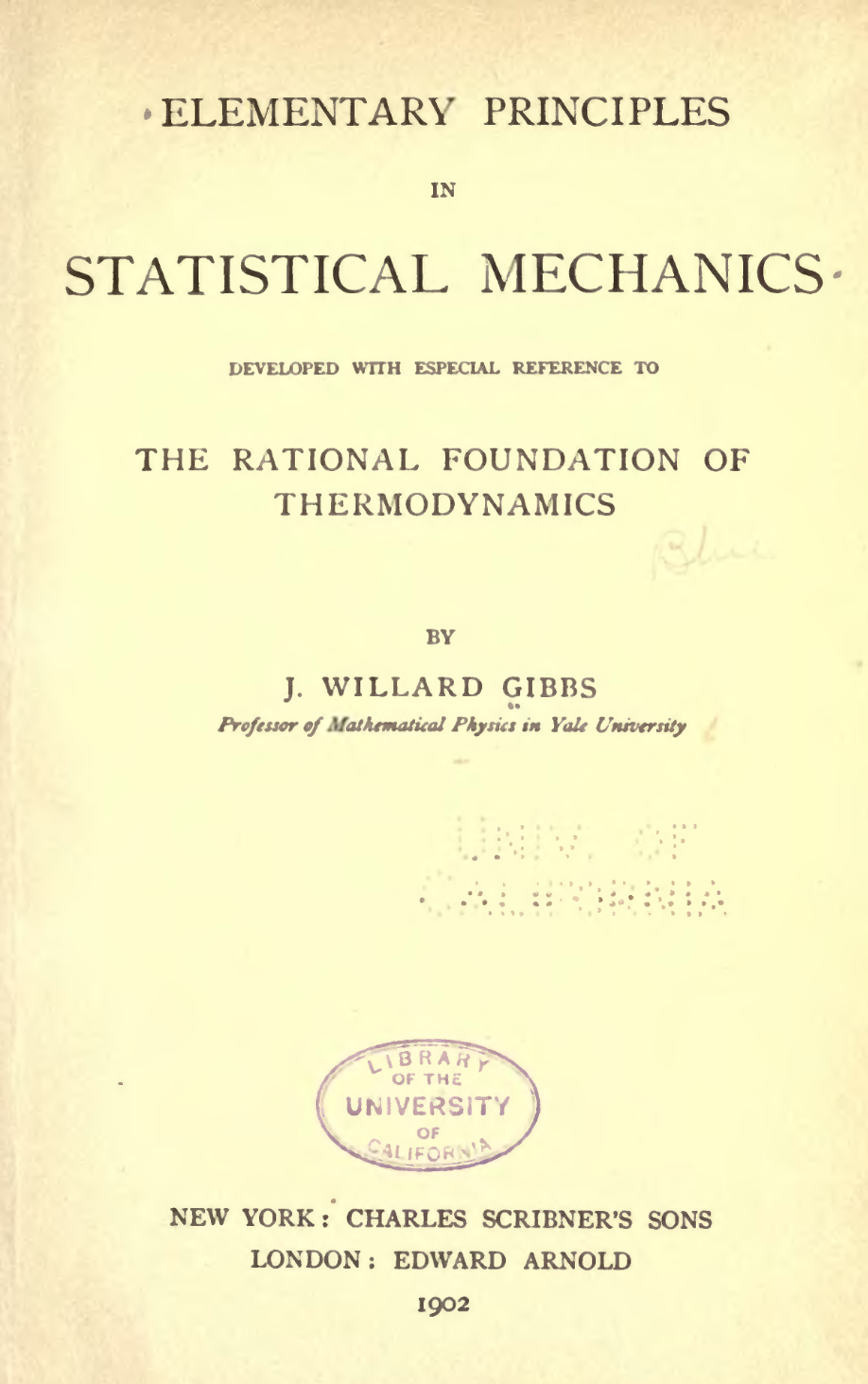
Cover of Gibbs' text on statistical mechanics

The term "statistical mechanics" was coined by the American mathematical physicist Gibbs in 1884. According to Gibbs, the term "statistical", in the context of mechanics, i.e. statistical mechanics, was first used by Maxwell in 1871:

"In dealing with masses of matter, while we do not perceive the individual molecules, we are compelled to adopt what I have described as the statistical method of calculation, and to abandon the strict dynamical method, in which we follow every motion by the calculus."

— J. Clerk Maxwell

"Probabilistic mechanics" might today seem a more appropriate term, but "statistical mechanics" is firmly entrenched. Shortly before his death, Gibbs published in 1902 Elementary Principles in Statistical Mechanics, a book which formalized statistical mechanics as a fully general approach to address all mechanical systems—macroscopic or microscopic, gaseous or non-gaseous. Gibbs' methods were initially derived in the framework of classical mechanics. However, they were of such generality that they were found to adapt easily to the later quantum mechanics, and still form the foundation of statistical mechanics to this day.

== Principles: mechanics and ensembles ==
In physics, two types of mechanics are usually examined: classical mechanics and quantum mechanics. For both types of mechanics, the standard mathematical approach is to consider two concepts:

- The complete state of the mechanical system at a given time, mathematically encoded as a phase point (classical mechanics) or a pure quantum state vector (quantum mechanics).
- An equation of motion which carries the state forward in time: Hamilton's equations (classical mechanics) or the Schrödinger equation (quantum mechanics).

Using these two concepts, the state at any other time, past or future, can in principle be calculated. There is however a disconnect between these laws and everyday life experiences, as we do not find it necessary (and in quantum mechanics, not theoretically possible) to know exactly at a microscopic level the simultaneous positions and velocities of each molecule while carrying out processes at the human scale (for example, when performing a chemical reaction). Statistical mechanics fills this disconnection between the laws of mechanics and the practical experience of incomplete knowledge, by adding some uncertainty about which state the system is in.

Whereas ordinary mechanics only considers the behaviour of a single state, statistical mechanics introduces the statistical ensemble, which is a large collection of virtual, independent copies of the system in various states. The statistical ensemble is a probability distribution over all possible states of the system. In classical statistical mechanics, the ensemble is a probability distribution over phase points (as opposed to a single phase point in ordinary mechanics), usually represented as a distribution in a phase space with canonical coordinate axes. In quantum statistical mechanics, the ensemble is a probability distribution over pure states and can be compactly summarized as a density matrix.

As is usual for probabilities, the ensemble can be interpreted in different ways:

- an ensemble can be taken to represent the various possible states that a single system could be in (epistemic probability, a form of knowledge), or
- the members of the ensemble can be understood as the states of the systems in experiments repeated on independent systems which have been prepared in a similar but imperfectly controlled manner (empirical probability), in the limit of an infinite number of trials.

These two meanings are equivalent for many purposes, and will be used interchangeably in this article.

However the probability is interpreted, each state in the ensemble evolves over time according to the equation of motion. Thus, the ensemble itself (the probability distribution over states) also evolves, as the virtual systems in the ensemble move through different states. The ensemble evolution is given by the Liouville equation (classical mechanics) or the von Neumann equation (quantum mechanics). These equations can be derived by applying the mechanical equation of motion separately to each virtual system contained in the ensemble, with the probability of each virtual system conserved over time as it evolves.

One special class of ensemble is those ensembles that do not evolve over time. These ensembles are known as equilibrium ensembles and their condition is known as statistical equilibrium. Statistical equilibrium occurs if, for each state in the ensemble, the ensemble also contains all of its future and past states with probabilities equal to the probability of being in that state. (By contrast, mechanical equilibrium is a state with a balance of forces that has ceased to evolve.) The study of equilibrium ensembles of isolated systems is the focus of statistical thermodynamics. Non-equilibrium statistical mechanics addresses the more general case of ensembles that change over time, and/or ensembles of non-isolated systems.

== Statistical thermodynamics ==
The primary goal of statistical thermodynamics (also known as equilibrium statistical mechanics) is to derive the classical thermodynamics of materials in terms of the properties of their constituent particles and the interactions between them. In other words, statistical thermodynamics provides a connection between the macroscopic properties of materials in thermodynamic equilibrium, and the microscopic behaviours and motions occurring inside the material.

Whereas statistical mechanics proper involves dynamics, here the attention is focused on statistical equilibrium (steady state). Statistical equilibrium does not mean that the particles have stopped moving (mechanical equilibrium), rather, only that the ensemble is not evolving.

=== Fundamental postulate ===
A sufficient (but not necessary) condition for statistical equilibrium with an isolated system is that the probability distribution is a function only of conserved properties (total energy, total particle numbers, etc.). There are many different equilibrium ensembles that can be considered, and only some of them correspond to thermodynamics. Additional postulates are necessary to motivate why the ensemble for a given system should have one form or another.

A common approach found in many textbooks is to take the equal a priori probability postulate. This postulate states that

For an isolated system with an exactly known energy and exactly known composition, the system can be found with equal probability in any microstate consistent with that knowledge.

The equal a priori probability postulate therefore provides a motivation for the microcanonical ensemble described below. There are various arguments in favour of the equal a priori probability postulate:

- Ergodic hypothesis: An ergodic system is one that evolves over time to explore "all accessible" states: all those with the same energy and composition. In an ergodic system, the microcanonical ensemble is the only possible equilibrium ensemble with fixed energy. This approach has limited applicability, since most systems are not ergodic.
- Principle of indifference: In the absence of any further information, we can only assign equal probabilities to each compatible situation.
- Maximum information entropy: A more elaborate version of the principle of indifference states that the correct ensemble is the ensemble that is compatible with the known information and that has the largest Gibbs entropy (information entropy).

Other fundamental postulates for statistical mechanics have also been proposed. For example, recent studies show that the theory of statistical mechanics can be built without the equal a priori probability postulate. One such formalism is based on the fundamental thermodynamic relation together with the following set of postulates:

1. The probability density function is proportional to some function of the ensemble parameters and random variables.
2. Thermodynamic state functions are described by ensemble averages of random variables.
3. The entropy as defined by Gibbs entropy formula matches with the entropy as defined in classical thermodynamics.

where the third postulate can be replaced by the following:

3. At infinite temperature, all the microstates have the same probability.

=== Three thermodynamic ensembles ===
There are three equilibrium ensembles with a simple form that can be defined for any isolated system bounded inside a finite volume. These are the most often discussed ensembles in statistical thermodynamics. In the macroscopic limit (defined below) they all correspond to classical thermodynamics.

Microcanonical ensemble
describes a system with a precisely given energy and fixed composition (precise number of particles). The microcanonical ensemble contains with equal probability each possible state that is consistent with that energy and composition.
Canonical ensemble
describes a system of fixed composition that is in thermal equilibrium with a heat bath of a precise temperature. The canonical ensemble contains states of varying energy but identical composition; the different states in the ensemble are accorded different probabilities depending on their total energy.
Grand canonical ensemble
describes a system with non-fixed composition (uncertain particle numbers) that is in thermal and chemical equilibrium with a thermodynamic reservoir. The reservoir has a precise temperature, and precise chemical potentials for various types of particle. The grand canonical ensemble contains states of varying energy and varying numbers of particles; the different states in the ensemble are accorded different probabilities depending on their total energy and total particle numbers.

For systems containing many particles (the thermodynamic limit), all three of the ensembles listed above tend to give identical behaviour. It is then simply a matter of mathematical convenience which ensemble is used. The Gibbs theorem about equivalence of ensembles was developed into the theory of concentration of measure phenomenon, which has applications in many areas of science, from functional analysis to methods of artificial intelligence and big data technology.

Important cases where the thermodynamic ensembles do not give identical results include:

- Microscopic systems.
- Large systems at a phase transition.
- Large systems with long-range interactions.

In these cases the correct thermodynamic ensemble must be chosen as there are observable differences between these ensembles not just in the size of fluctuations, but also in average quantities such as the distribution of particles. The correct ensemble is that which corresponds to the way the system has been prepared and characterized—in other words, the ensemble that reflects the knowledge about that system.

Thermodynamic ensembles
	Microcanonical	Canonical	Grand canonical
Fixed variables	$E, N, V$	$T, N, V$	$T, \mu, V$
Microscopic features	Number of microstates	Canonical partition function	Grand partition function
Microscopic features	$W$	$Z = \sum_k e^{- E_k / k_B T}$	$\mathcal Z = \sum_k e^{ -(E_k - \mu N_k) /k_B T}$
Macroscopic function	Boltzmann entropy	Helmholtz free energy	Grand potential
Macroscopic function	$S = k_B \log W$	$F = - k_B T \log Z$	$\Omega =- k_B T \log \mathcal Z$

=== Calculation methods ===
Once the partition function for an ensemble has been determined for a given system, that system is considered "solved," as all macroscopic thermodynamic observables can be derived from it via partial derivatives. Calculating the partition function of a thermodynamic ensemble is often a formidable challenge, however, as it requires performing a summation or integration over every possible microstate available to the system. While certain idealized models allow for exact analytical solutions, most realistic many-body systems are too complex for such a treatment. Consequently, various approximation techniques—such as mean-field theory, perturbation expansions, or Monte Carlo simulations—are employed to estimate the partition function and compute the average values of physical quantities.

==== Exact ====
There are some cases which allow exact solutions.

- For very small microscopic systems, the ensembles can be directly computed by simply enumerating over all possible states of the system (using exact diagonalization in quantum mechanics, or integral over all phase space in classical mechanics).
- Some large systems consist of many separable microscopic systems, and each of the subsystems can be analysed independently. Notably, idealized gases of non-interacting particles have this property, allowing exact derivations of Maxwell–Boltzmann statistics, Fermi–Dirac statistics, and Bose–Einstein statistics.
- A few large systems with interaction have been solved. By the use of subtle mathematical techniques, exact solutions have been found for a few toy models. Some examples include the Bethe ansatz, square-lattice Ising model in zero field, hard hexagon model.

==== Monte Carlo ====
Although some problems in statistical physics can be solved analytically using approximations and expansions, most current research utilizes the large processing power of modern computers to simulate or approximate solutions. A common approach to statistical problems is to use a Monte Carlo simulation to yield insight into the properties of a complex system. Monte Carlo methods are important in computational physics, physical chemistry, and related fields, and have diverse applications including medical physics, where they are used to model radiation transport for radiation dosimetry calculations.

The Monte Carlo method examines just a few of the possible states of the system, with the states chosen randomly (with a fair weight). As long as these states form a representative sample of the whole set of states of the system, the approximate characteristic function is obtained. As more and more random samples are included, the errors are reduced to an arbitrarily low level.

- The Metropolis–Hastings algorithm is a classic Monte Carlo method which was initially used to sample the canonical ensemble.
- Path integral Monte Carlo, also used to sample the canonical ensemble.

==== Other ====
- For rarefied non-ideal gases, approaches such as the cluster expansion use perturbation theory to include the effect of weak interactions, leading to a virial expansion.
- For dense fluids, another approximate approach is based on reduced distribution functions, in particular the radial distribution function.
- Molecular dynamics computer simulations can be used to calculate microcanonical ensemble averages, in ergodic systems. With the inclusion of a connection to a stochastic heat bath, they can also model canonical and grand canonical conditions.
- Mixed methods involving non-equilibrium statistical mechanical results (see below) may be useful.

== Non-equilibrium statistical mechanics ==
Many physical phenomena involve quasi-thermodynamic processes out of equilibrium, for example:

- heat transport by the internal motions in a material, driven by a temperature imbalance,
- electric currents carried by the motion of charges in a conductor, driven by a voltage imbalance,
- spontaneous chemical reactions driven by a decrease in free energy,
- friction, dissipation, quantum decoherence,
- systems being pumped by external forces (optical pumping, etc.),
- and irreversible processes in general.

All of these processes occur over time with characteristic rates. These rates are important in engineering. The field of non-equilibrium statistical mechanics is concerned with understanding these non-equilibrium processes at the microscopic level. (Statistical thermodynamics can only be used to calculate the final result, after the external imbalances have been removed and the ensemble has settled back down to equilibrium.)

In principle, non-equilibrium statistical mechanics could be mathematically exact: ensembles for an isolated system evolve over time according to deterministic equations such as Liouville's equation or its quantum equivalent, the von Neumann equation. These equations are the result of applying the mechanical equations of motion independently to each state in the ensemble. These ensemble evolution equations inherit much of the complexity of the underlying mechanical motion, and so exact solutions are very difficult to obtain. Moreover, the ensemble evolution equations are fully reversible and do not destroy information (the ensemble's Gibbs entropy is preserved). In order to make headway in modelling irreversible processes, it is necessary to consider additional factors besides probability and reversible mechanics.

Non-equilibrium mechanics is therefore an active area of theoretical research as the range of validity of these additional assumptions continues to be explored. A few approaches are described in the following subsections.

=== Stochastic methods ===
One approach to non-equilibrium statistical mechanics is to incorporate stochastic (random) behaviour into the system. Stochastic behaviour destroys information contained in the ensemble. While this is technically inaccurate (aside from hypothetical situations involving black holes, a system cannot in itself cause loss of information), the randomness is added to reflect that information of interest becomes converted over time into subtle correlations within the system, or to correlations between the system and environment. These correlations appear as chaotic or pseudorandom influences on the variables of interest. By replacing these correlations with randomness proper, the calculations can be made much easier.

- Boltzmann transport equation: An early form of stochastic mechanics appeared even before the term "statistical mechanics" had been coined, in studies of kinetic theory. James Clerk Maxwell had demonstrated that molecular collisions would lead to apparently chaotic motion inside a gas. Ludwig Boltzmann subsequently showed that, by taking this molecular chaos for granted as a complete randomization, the motions of particles in a gas would follow a simple Boltzmann transport equation that would rapidly restore a gas to an equilibrium state (see H-theorem). The Boltzmann transport equation and related approaches are important tools in non-equilibrium statistical mechanics due to their extreme simplicity. These approximations work well in systems where the "interesting" information is immediately (after just one collision) scrambled up into subtle correlations, which essentially restricts them to rarefied gases. The Boltzmann transport equation has been found to be very useful in simulations of electron transport in lightly doped semiconductors (in transistors), where the electrons are indeed analogous to a rarefied gas. A quantum technique related in theme is the random phase approximation.
- BBGKY hierarchy: In liquids and dense gases, it is not valid to immediately discard the correlations between particles after one collision. The BBGKY hierarchy (Bogoliubov–Born–Green–Kirkwood–Yvon hierarchy) gives a method for deriving Boltzmann-type equations but also extending them beyond the dilute gas case, to include correlations after a few collisions.
- Keldysh formalism (a.k.a. NEGF—non-equilibrium Green functions): A quantum approach to including stochastic dynamics is found in the Keldysh formalism. This approach is often used in electronic quantum transport calculations.
- Stochastic Liouville equation.

=== Near-equilibrium methods ===
Another important class of non-equilibrium statistical mechanical models deals with systems that are only very slightly perturbed from equilibrium. With very small perturbations, the response can be analysed in linear response theory. A remarkable result, as formalized by the fluctuation–dissipation theorem, is that the response of a system when near equilibrium is precisely related to the fluctuations that occur when the system is in total equilibrium. Essentially, a system that is slightly away from equilibrium—whether put there by external forces or by fluctuations—relaxes towards equilibrium in the same way, since the system cannot tell the difference or "know" how it came to be away from equilibrium.

This provides an indirect avenue for obtaining numbers such as ohmic conductivity and thermal conductivity by extracting results from equilibrium statistical mechanics. Since equilibrium statistical mechanics is mathematically well defined and (in some cases) more amenable for calculations, the fluctuation–dissipation connection can be a convenient shortcut for calculations in near-equilibrium statistical mechanics.

A few of the theoretical tools used to make this connection include:

- Fluctuation–dissipation theorem
- Onsager reciprocal relations
- Green–Kubo relations
- Landauer–Büttiker formalism
- Mori–Zwanzig formalism
- GENERIC formalism

=== Hybrid methods ===
An advanced approach uses a combination of stochastic methods and linear response theory. As an example, one approach to compute quantum coherence effects (weak localization, conductance fluctuations) in the conductance of an electronic system is the use of the Green–Kubo relations, with the inclusion of stochastic dephasing by interactions between various electrons by use of the Keldysh method.

== Applications ==
The ensemble formalism can be used to analyze general mechanical systems with uncertainty in knowledge about the state of a system. Ensembles are also used in:

- propagation of uncertainty over time,
- regression analysis of gravitational orbits,
- ensemble forecasting of weather,
- dynamics of neural networks,
- bounded-rational potential games in game theory and non-equilibrium economics.

Statistical physics explains and quantitatively describes superconductivity, superfluidity, turbulence, collective phenomena in solids and plasma, and the structural features of liquid. It underlies modern astrophysics and the virial theorem. In solid state physics, statistical physics aids the study of liquid crystals, phase transitions, and critical phenomena. Many experimental studies of matter are entirely based on the statistical description of a system. These include the scattering of cold neutrons, X-ray, visible light, and more. Statistical physics also plays a role in materials science, nuclear physics, astrophysics, chemistry, biology and medicine (e.g. study of the spread of infectious diseases).

Analytical and computational techniques derived from statistical physics of disordered systems, can be extended to large-scale problems, including machine learning, e.g. to analyze the weight space of deep neural networks. Statistical physics is thus finding applications in the area of medical diagnostics.

=== Quantum statistical mechanics ===
Quantum statistical mechanics is statistical mechanics applied to quantum mechanical systems. In quantum mechanics, a statistical ensemble (probability distribution over possible quantum states) is described by a density operator S, which is a non-negative, self-adjoint, trace-class operator of trace 1 on the Hilbert space H describing the quantum system. This can be shown under various mathematical formalisms for quantum mechanics. One such formalism is provided by quantum logic.

== Index of statistical mechanics topics ==
=== Physics ===
- Probability amplitude
- Statistical physics
- Boltzmann factor
- Feynman–Kac formula
- Fluctuation theorem
- Information entropy
- Vacuum expectation value
- Cosmic variance
- Negative probability
- Gibbs state
- Master equation
- Partition function (mathematics)
- Quantum probability

=== Percolation theory ===
- Percolation theory
- Schramm–Loewner evolution

== See also ==
- List of textbooks in thermodynamics and statistical mechanics
- Laplace transform § Statistical mechanics
