= Thermodynamic limit =

Limit of a constant-density system of particles as its volume increases

In statistical mechanics, the thermodynamic limit or macroscopic limit, of a system is the limit for a large number N of particles (e.g., atoms or molecules) where the volume V is taken to grow in proportion with the number of particles. The thermodynamic limit is defined as the limit of a system with a large volume, with the particle density held fixed:

$$N \to \infty,\, V \to \infty,\, \frac N V =\text{constant}$$

In this limit, macroscopic thermodynamics is valid. There, thermal fluctuations in global quantities are negligible, and all thermodynamic quantities, such as pressure and energy, are simply functions of the thermodynamic variables, such as temperature and density. For example, for a large volume of gas, the fluctuations of the total internal energy are negligible and can be ignored, and the average internal energy can be predicted from knowledge of the pressure and temperature of the gas.

Note that not all types of thermal fluctuations disappear in the thermodynamic limit—only the fluctuations in system variables cease to be important. There will still be detectable fluctuations (typically at microscopic scales) in some physically observable quantities, such as

- microscopic spatial density fluctuations in a gas scatter light (Rayleigh scattering)
- motion of visible particles (Brownian motion)
- electromagnetic field fluctuations, (blackbody radiation in free space, Johnson–Nyquist noise in wires)

Mathematically an asymptotic analysis is performed when considering the thermodynamic limit.

== Origin ==
The thermodynamic limit is essentially a consequence of the central limit theorem of probability theory. The internal energy of a gas of N molecules is the sum of order N contributions, each of which is approximately independent, and so the central limit theorem predicts that the ratio of the size of the fluctuations to the mean is of order 1/N^{1/2}. Thus for a macroscopic volume with perhaps the Avogadro number of molecules, fluctuations are negligible, and so thermodynamics works. In general, almost all macroscopic volumes of gases, liquids and solids can be treated as being in the thermodynamic limit.

For small microscopic systems, different statistical ensembles (microcanonical, canonical, grand canonical) permit different behaviours. For example, in the canonical ensemble the number of particles inside the system is held fixed, whereas particle number can fluctuate in the grand canonical ensemble. In the thermodynamic limit, these global fluctuations cease to be important.

It is at the thermodynamic limit that the additivity property of macroscopic extensive variables is obeyed. That is, the entropy of two systems or objects taken together (in addition to their energy and volume) is the sum of the two separate values. In some models of statistical mechanics, the thermodynamic limit exists, but depends on boundary conditions. For example, this happens in six vertex model: the bulk free energy is different for periodic boundary conditions and for domain wall boundary conditions.

== Inapplicability ==
A thermodynamic limit does not exist in all cases. Usually, a model is taken to the thermodynamic limit by increasing the volume together with the particle number while keeping the particle number density constant. Two common regularizations are the box regularization, where matter is confined to a geometrical box, and the periodic regularization, where matter is placed on the surface of a flat torus (i.e. box with periodic boundary conditions). However, the following three examples demonstrate cases where these approaches do not lead to a thermodynamic limit:

- Particles with an attractive potential that (unlike the Van der Waals force between molecules) doesn't turn around and become repulsive even at very short distances: In such a case, matter tends to clump together instead of spreading out evenly over all the available space. This is the case for gravitational systems, where matter tends to clump into filaments, galactic superclusters, galaxies, stellar clusters and stars.
- A system with a nonzero average charge density: In this case, periodic boundary conditions cannot be used because there is no consistent value for the electric flux. With a box regularization, on the other hand, matter tends to accumulate along the boundary of the box instead of being spread more or less evenly with only minor fringe effects.
- Certain quantum mechanical phenomena near absolute zero temperature present anomalies; e.g., Bose–Einstein condensation, superconductivity and superfluidity.
- Any system that is not H-stable; this case is also called catastrophic.
