= Universal conductance fluctuations =

Phenomenon in mesoscopic physics

Universal conductance fluctuations (UCF) in mesoscopic physics is a phenomenon encountered in electrical transport experiments in mesoscopic species. The measured electrical conductance will vary from sample to sample, mainly due to inhomogeneous scattering sites. Fluctuations originate from coherence effects for electronic wavefunctions and thus the phase-coherence length $\textstyle l_\phi$ needs be larger than the momentum relaxation length $\textstyle l_m$. UCF is more profound when electrical transport is in weak localization regime. $\textstyle l_\phi<l_c$ where $l_c=M\cdot l_m$, $\textstyle M$ is the number of conduction channels and $\textstyle l_m$ is the momentum relaxation due to phonon scattering events length or mean free path. For weakly localized samples fluctuation in conductance is equal to fundamental conductance $\textstyle G_o=2e^2/h$ regardless of the number of channels.

Many factors will influence the amplitude of UCF. At zero temperature without decoherence, the UCF is influenced by mainly two factors, the symmetry and the shape of the sample. Recently, a third key factor, anisotropy of Fermi surface, is also found to fundamentally influence the amplitude of UCF.

== See also ==
- Speckle patterns, the optical analogues of conductance fluctuation patterns.
