= List of things named after Josiah W. Gibbs =

Things named after American scientist Josiah Willard Gibbs:

- Gibbs algorithm
- Gibbs canonical ensemble
- Gibbs distribution
- Gibbs ensemble
- Gibbs entropy
- Gibbs free energy
- Gibbs H-theorem
- Gibbs' inequality
- Gibbs isotherm
- Gibbs lemma
- Gibbs measure
  - Gibbs random field
- Gibbs phase rule
- Gibbs paradox
- Gibbs phenomenon
- Gibbs sampling
- Gibbs state
- Gibbs's thermodynamic surface
- Gibbs vector
- Gibbs–Appell equation of motion
- Gibbs–Donnan effect
- Gibbs–Duhem equation
- Gibbs–Helmholtz equation
- Gibbs–Marangoni effect
- Gibbs–Thomson effect
- Gibbs–Thomson equation
- Gibbs–Wulff theorem
- Massieu–Gibbs function

== Heavenly bodies ==
- 2937 Gibbs (asteroid)
- Gibbs (crater)

== Other honours ==
- Gibbs Society of Biological Thermodynamics
- Josiah Willard Gibbs Lectureship
- Willard Gibbs Award
