= Vector Analysis =

Textbook by E. B. Wilson based on the lectures of J. W. Gibbs

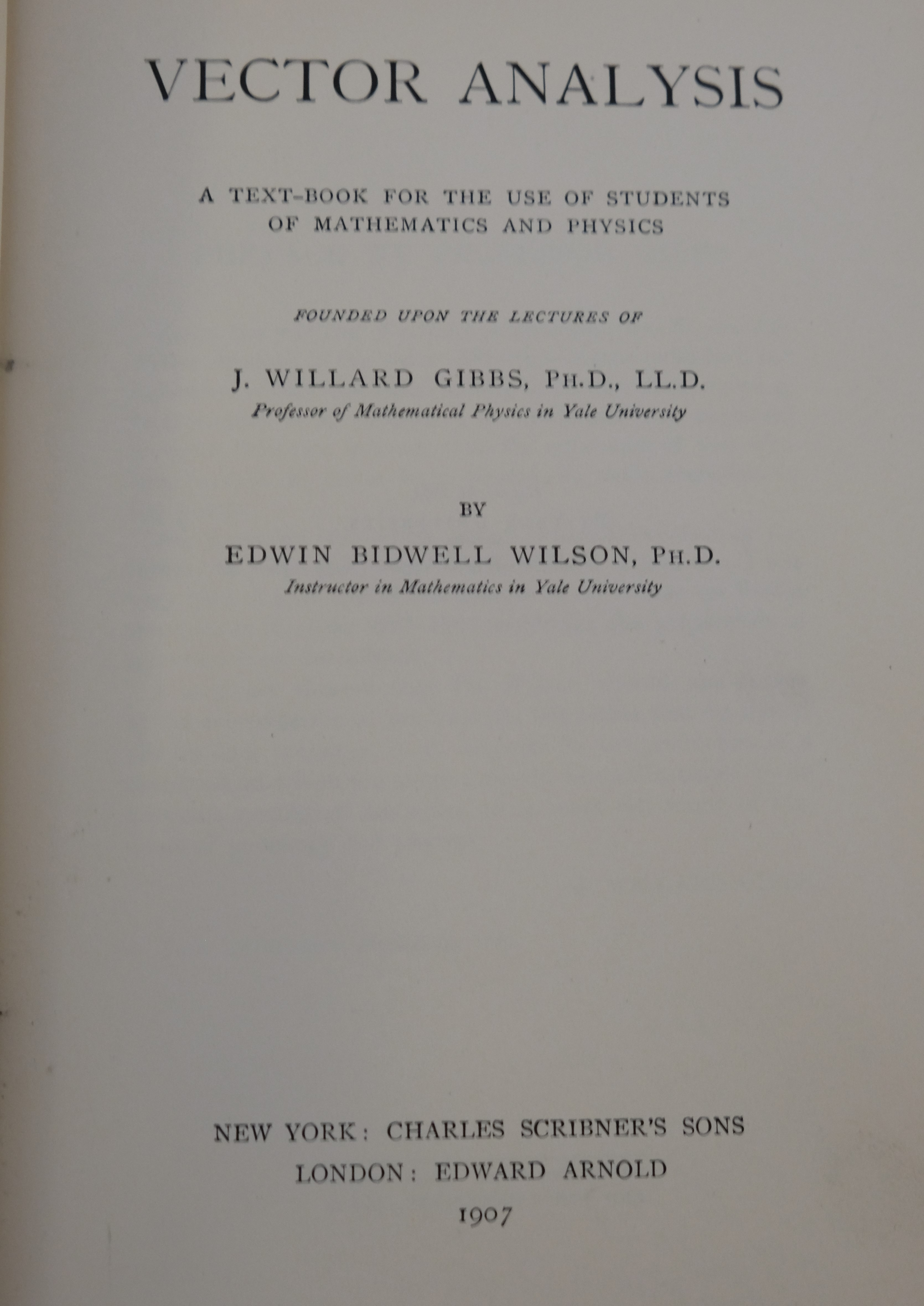
- Title page to Vector Analysis by Edwin Bidwell Wilson (1907 copy)
- Author: Edwin Bidwell Wilson
- Language: English
- Subject: Vector calculus
- Publisher: Charles Scribner's Sons, Dover Publications
- Publication date: 1901
- Publication place: United States of America

Vector Analysis is a textbook by Edwin Bidwell Wilson, first published in 1901 and based on the lectures that Josiah Willard Gibbs had delivered on the subject at Yale University. The book did much to standardize the notation and vocabulary of three-dimensional linear algebra and vector calculus, as used by physicists and mathematicians. It was reprinted by Yale in 1913, 1916, 1922, 1925, 1929, 1931, and 1943. The work is now in the public domain. It was reprinted by Dover Publications in 1960.

== Contents ==
The book carries the subtitle "A text-book for the use of students of mathematics and physics. Founded upon the lectures of J. Willard Gibbs, Ph.D., LL.D." The first chapter covers vectors in three spatial dimensions, the concept of a (real) scalar, and the product of a scalar with a vector. The second chapter introduces the dot and cross products for pairs of vectors. These are extended to a scalar triple product and a quadruple product. Pages 77–81 cover the essentials of spherical trigonometry, a topic of considerable interest at the time because of its use in celestial navigation. The third chapter introduces the vector calculus notation based on the del operator. The Helmholtz decomposition of a vector field is given on page 237.

The final eight pages develop bivectors as these were integral to the course on the electromagnetic theory of light that Professor Gibbs taught at Yale. First Wilson associates a bivector with an ellipse. The product of the bivector with a complex number on the unit circle is then called an elliptical rotation. Wilson continues with a description of elliptic harmonic motion and the case of stationary waves.

== Genesis ==
Hermann Grassmann had introduced basic ideas of a linear space in 1844 and 1862, and W. K. Clifford published Elements of Dynamic in 1878, so as Gibbs was teaching physics in the 1880s he took these developments into consideration for his students. A pamphlet that he printed for them acknowledges both Grassmann and Clifford. The influence of Grassmann is seen in the bivectors, and the influence of Clifford in the decomposition of the quaternion product into scalar product and cross product.

In 1888 Gibbs sent a copy of his pamphlet to Oliver Heaviside who was formulating his own vectorial system in the Transactions of the Royal Society, praised Gibbs' "little book", saying it "deserves to be well known". However, he also noted that it was "much too condensed for a first introduction to the subject".

On the occasion of the bicentennial of Yale University, a series of publications were to be issued to showcase Yale's role in the advancement of knowledge. Gibbs was authoring Elementary Principles in Statistical Mechanics for that series. Mindful of the demand for innovative university textbooks, the editor of the series, Professor Morris, wished to include also a volume dedicated to Gibbs's lectures on vectors, but Gibbs's time and attention were entirely absorbed by the Statistical Mechanics.

E. B. Wilson was then a new graduate student in mathematics. He had learned about quaternions from James Mills Peirce at Harvard, but Dean A. W. Phillips persuaded him to take Gibbs's course on vectors, which treated similar problems from a rather different perspective. After Wilson had completed the course, Morris approached him about the project of producing a textbook. Wilson wrote the book by expanding his own class notes, providing exercises, and consulting with others (including his father).

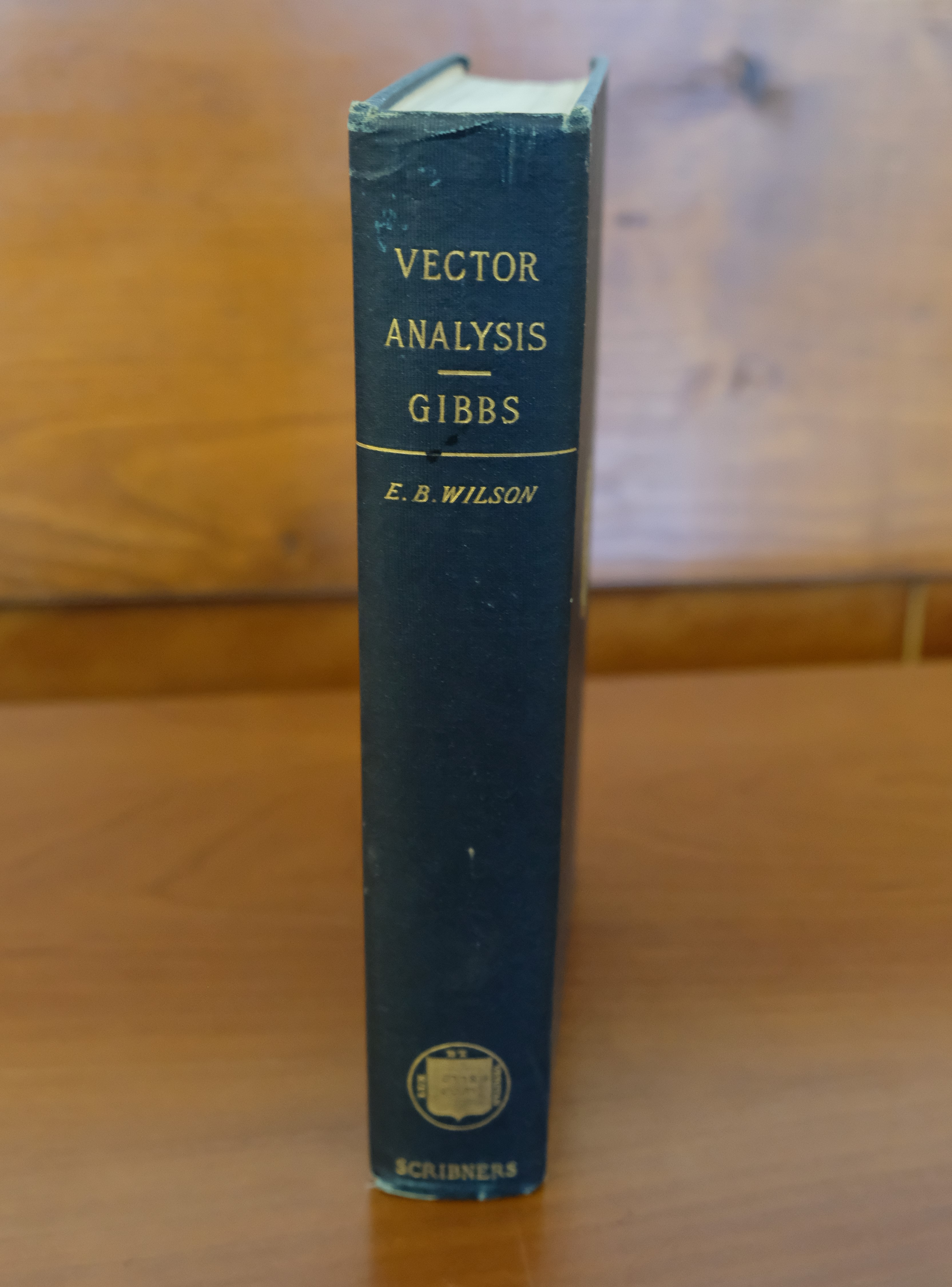
1907 copy of Vector Analysis

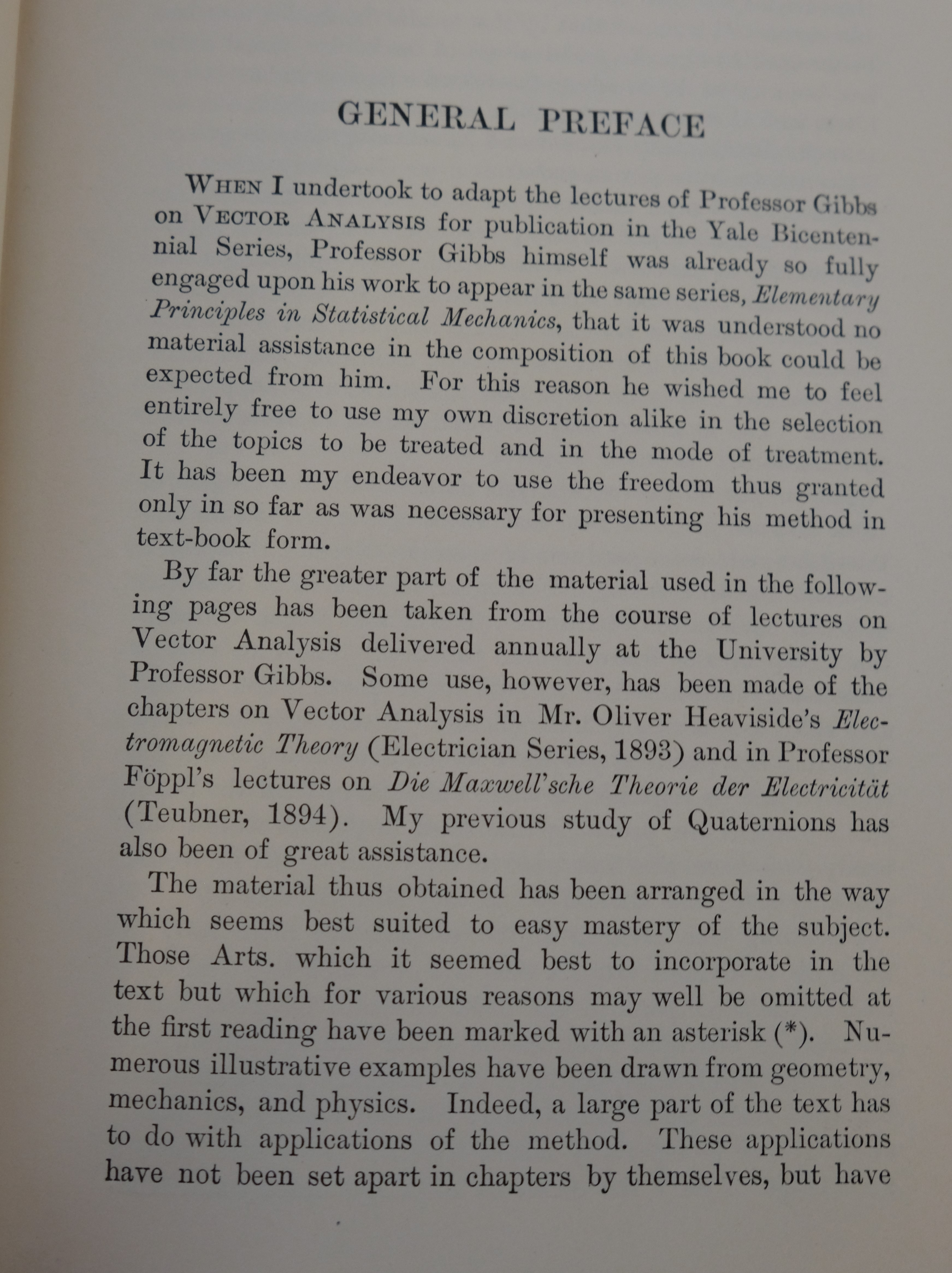
Preface to Vector Analysis (1907)

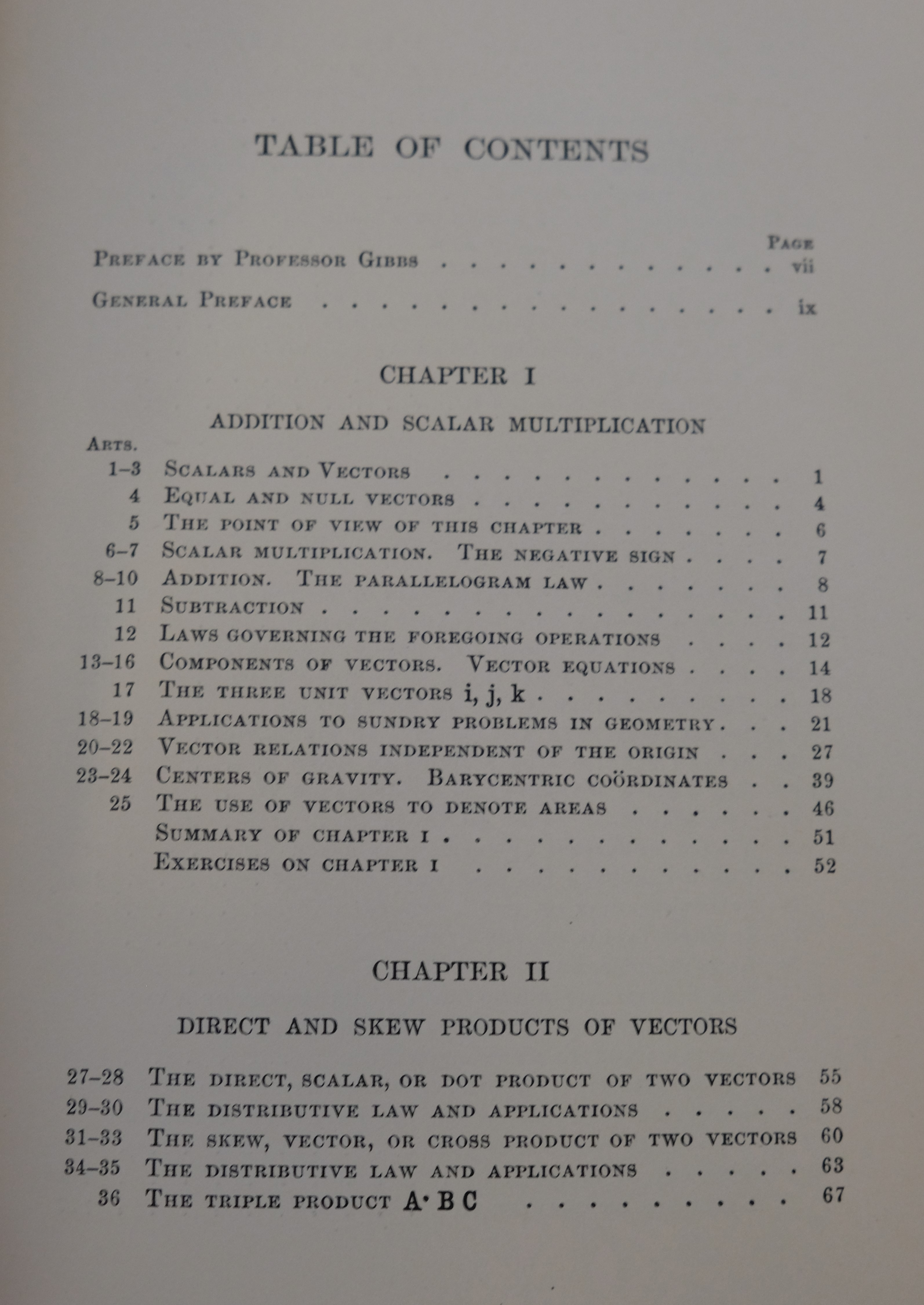
Table of contents to Vector Analysis (1907)

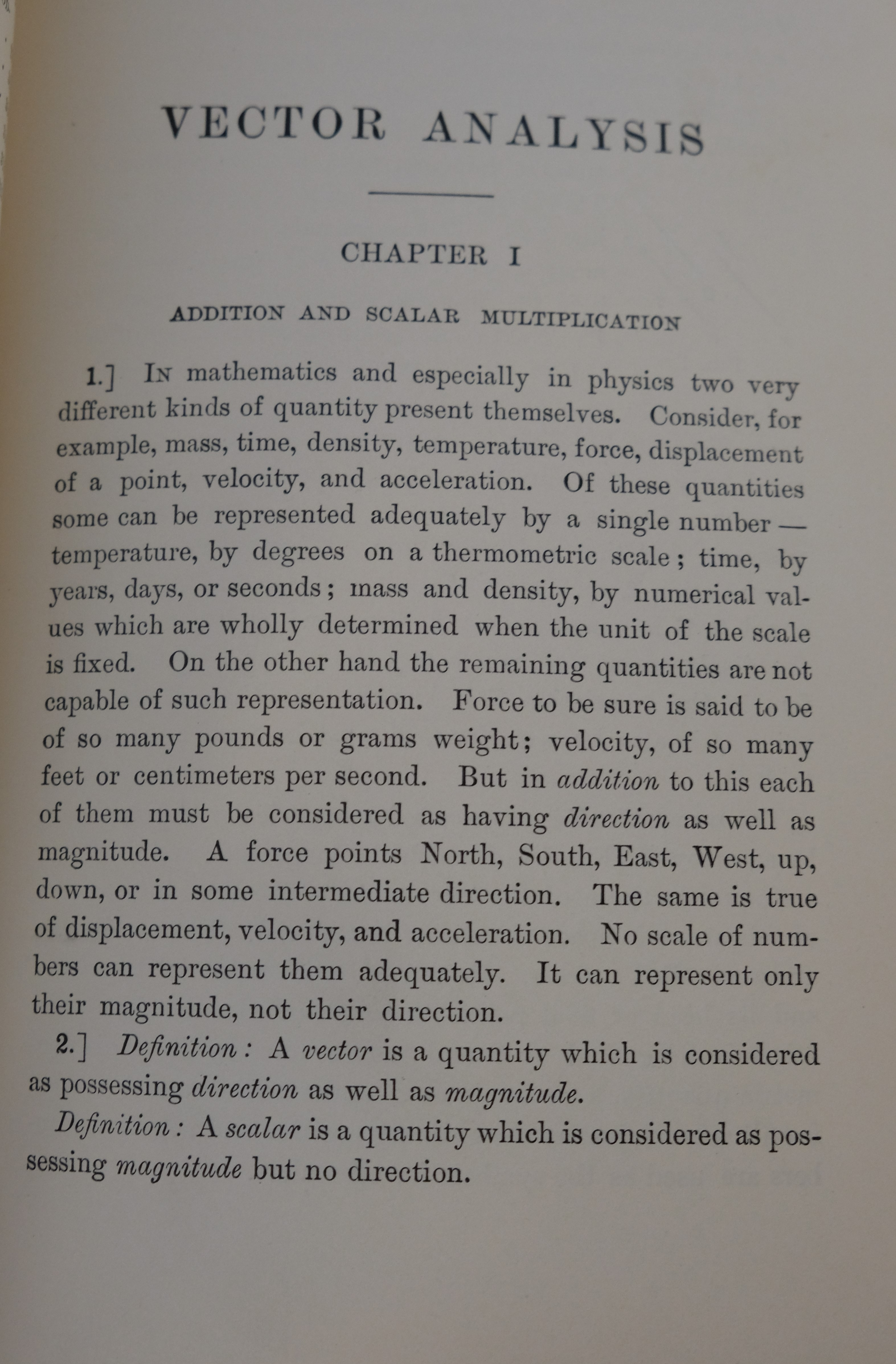
First page of Vector Analysis (1907)
