= Edwin Bidwell Wilson =

American mathematician (1879–1964)

- Born: April 25, 1879; Hartford, Connecticut, U.S.
- Died: December 28, 1964 (aged 85); Brookline, Massachusetts, U.S.
- Education: Yale University; Harvard College
- Known for: Wilson score interval
- Awards: Distinguished Civilian Service Award (US Navy, 1960); Superior Civilian Service Award (US Navy, 1964); Lewis Award (American Philosophical Society, 1963)
- Scientific career
- Fields: Mathematics; Statistics; Aeronautics
- Workplaces: Massachusetts Institute of Technology
- Doctoral advisor: Josiah Willard Gibbs
- Doctoral students: Jane Worcester

Edwin Bidwell Wilson (April 25, 1879 – December 28, 1964) was an American mathematician, statistician, physicist and general polymath. He was the sole protégé of Yale University physicist Josiah Willard Gibbs and was mentor to MIT economist Paul Samuelson. Wilson had a distinguished academic career at Yale and MIT, followed by a long and distinguished period of service as a civilian employee of the US Navy in the Office of Naval Research. In his latter role, he was awarded the Distinguished Civilian Service Award, the highest honorary award available to a civilian employee of the US Navy. Wilson made broad contributions to mathematics, statistics and aeronautics, and is well known for producing a number of widely used textbooks. He is perhaps best known for his derivation of the eponymously named Wilson score interval, which is a confidence interval used widely in statistics. He was also the first managing editor of The Proceedings of the National Academy of Sciences (PNAS).

== Life ==
Edwin Bidwell Wilson was born in Hartford, Connecticut, to Edwin Horace Wilson (a teacher and superintendent of schools in Middletown, Connecticut) and Jane Amelia (Bidwell) Wilson. He had two sisters and two brothers; he and his siblings all went on to achieve high levels of education and professional success. Although born in Hartford, Wilson grew up in Middleton, and for a period he attended a private school that had been set up by his father, where he was substantially younger than the other students. Wilson performed at a high level academically from a young age. He recounts that (according to his mother) he taught himself arithmetic at the age of four using his mother's sixty-inch tape measure; he learned multiplication by folding a tape measure into equal-length increments and then counting the number of folded parts. At the age of fifteen, Wilson sat and passed the entrance examination for Yale University (his father's alma mater), but his father would not allow him to attend at this age, as he considered him too young; he waited until he was sixteen and then attended Harvard College, being admitted on the basis of his entrance examination at Yale.

Wilson attended Harvard College as an undergraduate, receiving his AB summa cum laude in 1899. He then attended Yale University for his PhD, graduating in 1901. He also studied mathematics from 1902 to 1903 in Paris, primarily at the École normale supérieure, before returning to teach at Yale. At Yale, Wilson worked under the supervision of Josiah Willard Gibbs and compiled an important textbook on vector analysis from Gibbs' lecture notes. Gibbs died when Wilson had just turned twenty-four, but he exerted a strong influence on Wilson through his early supervision and through Wilson's experience compiling Gibbs' notes. Wilson became an assistant professor of mathematics at Yale in 1906, then associate professor of mathematics at Massachusetts Institute of Technology (MIT) in 1907, then Professor of Mathematics in 1911, then Head of the Department of Physics in 1917, and then Professor of Vital Statistics at the Harvard School of Public Health in 1922.

During World War I, Wilson gave a course in aeronautical engineering to US Army and Navy officers at MIT. Wilson retired from academic work in 1945 and worked as a consultant at the Office of Naval Research until his death in 1964. For his service to the US Navy during and after the war, Wilson was awarded the Superior Civilian Service Award in 1960 and the Distinguished Civilian Service Award in 1964. The latter award is the highest honorary award available for a civilian employee of the US Navy. Wilson was also awarded an honorary LLD degree form Wesleyan University in 1955. Wilson had a broad range of interests and skills, and he served in a number of distinguished roles in national academies for the arts and sciences. He was a member of the National Academy of Sciences and served as its vice-president from 1949 to 1953; he was a Fellow of the Royal Statistical Society and the American Statistical Association, serving as President of the latter in 1929; he was a member of the American Academy of Arts and Sciences, serving as president from 1927 to 1931; and he was a member of the American Philosophical Society. Wilson won the John Frederick Lewis Award from the American Philosophical Society in 1963.

Wilson married Ethel Sentner on 5 July 1911 and they had two daughters, Doris and Enid. Doris Wilson graduated from McGill University in 1946 and became an analytical chemist working at the Peter Bent Brigham Hospital and Harvard School of Public Health. Enid Wilson graduated from Brown University and Simmons College Library School and worked as a cataloguer at the University of Rhode Island and Boston University, also serving as a secretary in the Wellesley Historical Society. Ethel Wilson (Edwin's wife) died in 1957 and he died seven years later on 28 December 1964. His daughters survived him by almost fifty years, and both died within a month of each other in 2014. Wilson and his wife and daughters are buried at Mount Auburn Cemetery in Cambridge, Massachusetts.

== Academic works and legacy ==
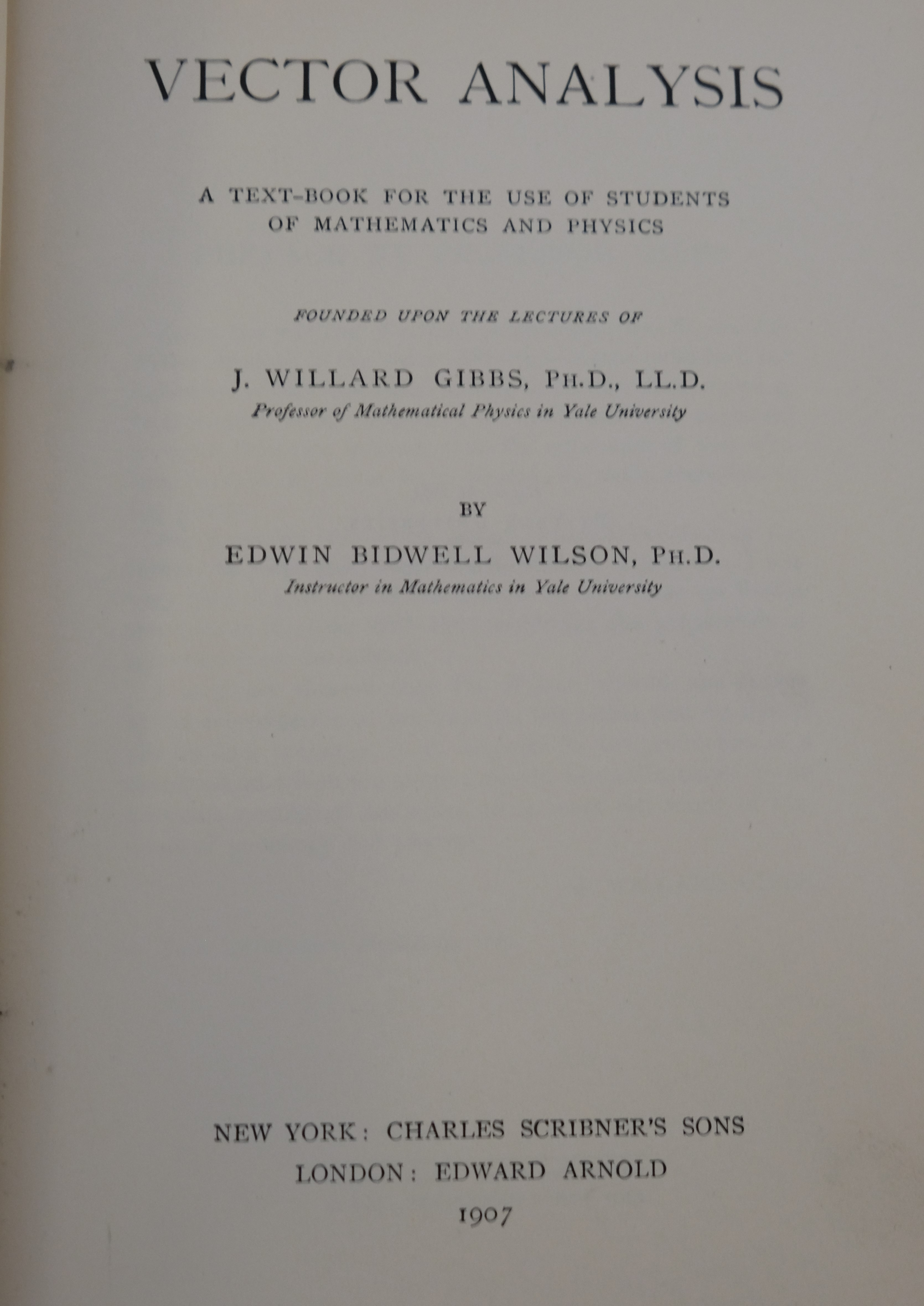
Title page to Vector Analysis (1907)

Wilson published scholarly papers on a wide range of topics in mathematics, statistics, physics, and economics, but most of his work was in mathematics. During his career, Wilson wrote three widely used textbooks. At the age of twenty-two he compiled the textbook Vector Analysis based on the lectures of his doctoral advisor Josiah Willard Gibbs, as Gibbs was at the time busy preparing his book on thermodynamics. This textbook was widely used by mathematicians and physicists and had a lasting effect on notation in the field. Wilson gave a plenary address at the International Congress of Mathematicians in 1904 in Heidelberg where he summarised some further unpublished work by Gibbs (which he later published).

Later in his career, Wilson published the textbook Advanced Calculus based on his own lecture materials, and the textbook Aeronautics which included dimensional analysis.

In Wilson (1927) he introduced the Wilson score interval, a binomial proportion confidence interval, which later motivated the "plus four rule" proposed by Alan Agresti and Brent Coull in 1998, which uses a pseudocount of two (add two to both your count of successes and failures, so four total) for estimating the probability of a Bernoulli variable with a confidence interval of two standard deviations in each direction (approximately 95% coverage).

Wilson published a substantial number of papers on geometry, statistics, biostatistics, and other areas. He also conducted a number of reviews of scientific theories and works, and he was known to be critical of aspects of the works of Hilbert and Einstein. In 1904 Wilson published a review of Bertrand Russell's works The Principles of Mathematics and An Essay on the Foundations of Geometry where he highlighted the strong role of Peano in shaping the foundations of mathematics. At the time Peano's works were not well known in the US and so this review helped to establish interest in Peano's work.

== Selected works ==
- 1901: Vector Analysis: A Text-book for the Use of Students of Mathematics & Physics, Founded Upon the Lectures of J. W. Gibbs.
- 1904: The Foundations of Mathematics. Bulletin of the American Mathematical Society 11(2), pp. 74–93. (A review of The Principles of Mathematics and An Essay on the Foundations of Geometry by Bertrand Russell.)
- 1912: Advanced Calculus. (Link from Internet Archive.)
- 1912: (with Gilbert N. Lewis) The Space-Time Manifold of Relativity. The Non-Euclidean Geometry of Mechanics and Electromagnetics Proceedings of the American Academy of Arts and Sciences 48(11), pp. 389–507.
- 1920: Aeronautics: A Class Text. John Wiley & Sons. (Link from Internet Archive.)
- 1927: Probable inference, the law of succession, and statistical inference. Journal of the American Statistical Association 22(158), pp. 209-212.
