= Lynde Wheeler =

American physicist

Lynde Phelps Wheeler (July 27, 1874 – February 1, 1959) was an American physicist and engineer.

He was born in Bridgeport, Connecticut and was educated at Yale University, where he received a Ph.D. in physics in 1902, with a thesis on "The Reflection of Polarized Light from Mercury in Water." He remained at Yale as a professor in the physics department until 1926, when he joined the Radio Division of the United States Naval Research Laboratory. In 1936 he became chief of engineering in the information division of the Federal Communications Commission (FCC). He retired from the FCC in 1946 and became a consultant for the private firm Pickard and Burns, Inc., in Needham, Massachusetts.

Wheeler was also a fellow of the Institute of Radio Engineers since 1928, and served as its president in 1943. In addition to his research in optics, electricity, and radio, Wheeler published a biography of his mentor at Yale, mathematical physicist J. Willard Gibbs. He died in Roanoke, Virginia.
