= Josiah Willard Gibbs =

American scientist (1839–1903)

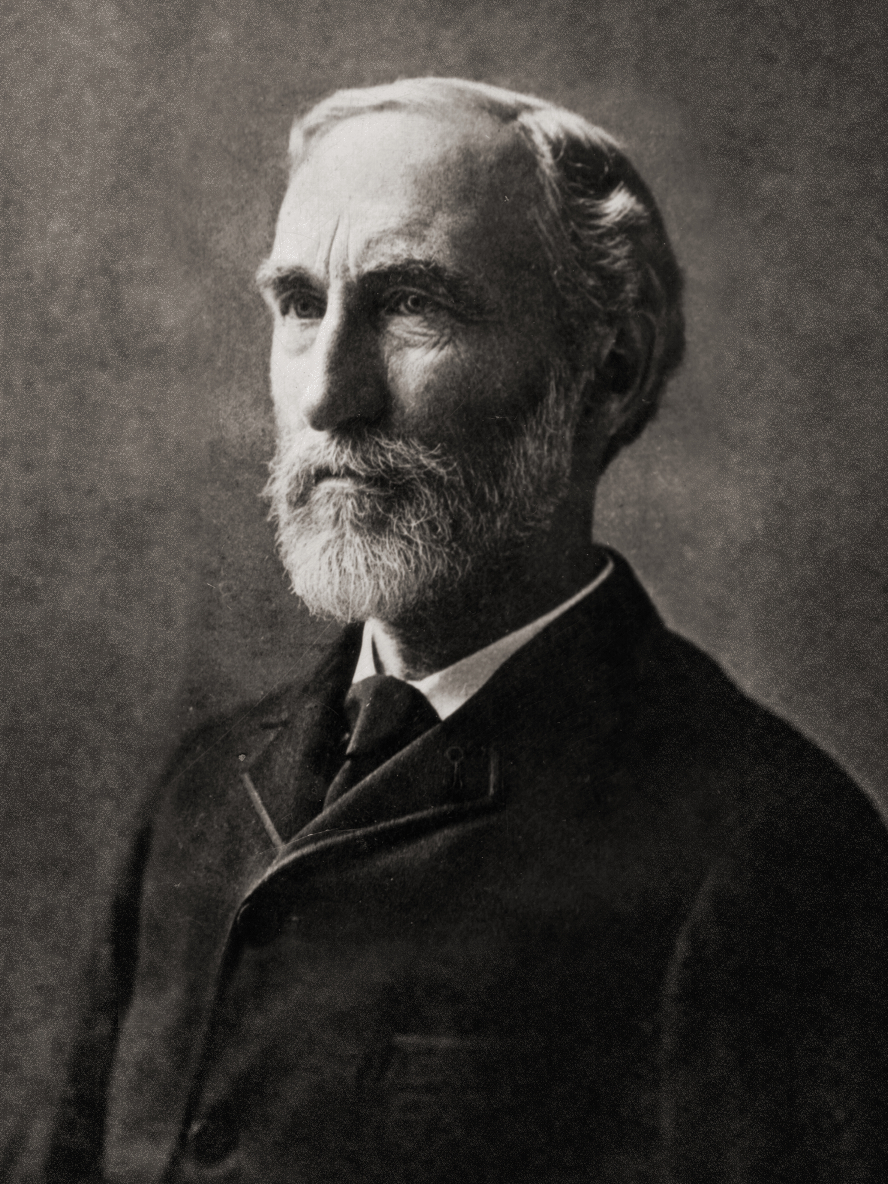
- Born: February 11, 1839; New Haven, Connecticut, U.S.
- Died: April 28, 1903 (aged 64); New Haven, Connecticut, U.S.
- Education: Yale College (BA, PhD)
- Known for: List: Statistical mechanics; Chemical thermodynamics; Chemical potential; Cross product; Dyadics; Exergy; Principle of maximum work; Phase rule; Phase space; Physical optics; Physics of phase separation; Statistical ensemble; Surface stress; Vector calculus; Gibbs entropy; Gibbs algorithm; Gibbs distribution; Gibbs' elasticity; Gibbs function; Gibbs free energy; Gibbs' inequality; Gibbs isotherm; Gibbs' H theorem; Gibbs lemma; Gibbs measure; Gibbs paradox; Gibbs phenomenon; Gibbs state; Gibbs' thermodynamic surface; Gibbs vector; Gibbs–Appell equation of motion; Gibbs–Donnan effect; Gibbs–Duhem equation; Gibbs–Helmholtz equation; Gibbs–Marangoni effect; Gibbs–Thomson equation; Gibbs–Thomson effect; Gibbs–Wulff theorem
- Awards: Rumford Prize (1880); ForMemRS (1897); Copley Medal (1901)
- Scientific career
- Fields: Chemistry; Mathematics; Physics
- Workplaces: Yale College
- Thesis: On the form of the teeth of wheels in spur gearing (1863)
- Doctoral advisor: Hubert Anson Newton
- Doctoral students: Edwin Bidwell Wilson; Irving Fisher; Henry Andrews Bumstead; Lynde Wheeler; Lee De Forest

Josiah Willard Gibbs (/ɡɪbz/; February 11, 1839 – April 28, 1903) was an American mechanical engineer and scientist who made fundamental theoretical contributions to physics, chemistry, and mathematics. His work on the applications of thermodynamics was instrumental in transforming physical chemistry into a rigorous deductive science. Together with James Clerk Maxwell and Ludwig Boltzmann, he created statistical mechanics (a term that he coined), explaining the laws of thermodynamics as consequences of the statistical properties of ensembles of the possible states of a physical system composed of many particles. Gibbs also worked on the application of Maxwell's equations to problems in physical optics. As a mathematician, he created modern vector calculus (independently of the British scientist Oliver Heaviside, who carried out similar work during the same period) and described the Gibbs phenomenon in the theory of Fourier analysis.

In 1863, Yale University awarded Gibbs the first American doctorate in engineering. After a three-year sojourn in Europe, Gibbs spent the rest of his career at Yale, where he was a professor of mathematical physics from 1871 until his death in 1903. Working in relative isolation, he became the earliest theoretical scientist in the United States to earn an international reputation and was praised by Albert Einstein as "the greatest mind in American history". In 1901, Gibbs received what was then considered the highest honor awarded by the international scientific community, the Copley Medal of the Royal Society of London, "for his contributions to mathematical physics".

Commentators and biographers have remarked on the contrast between Gibbs's quiet, solitary life in turn of the century New England and the great international impact of his ideas. Though his work was almost entirely theoretical, the practical value of Gibbs's contributions became evident with the development of industrial chemistry during the first half of the 20th century. According to Robert A. Millikan, in pure science, Gibbs "did for statistical mechanics and thermodynamics what Laplace did for celestial mechanics and Maxwell did for electrodynamics, namely, made his field a well-nigh finished theoretical structure".

== Biography ==
=== Family background ===
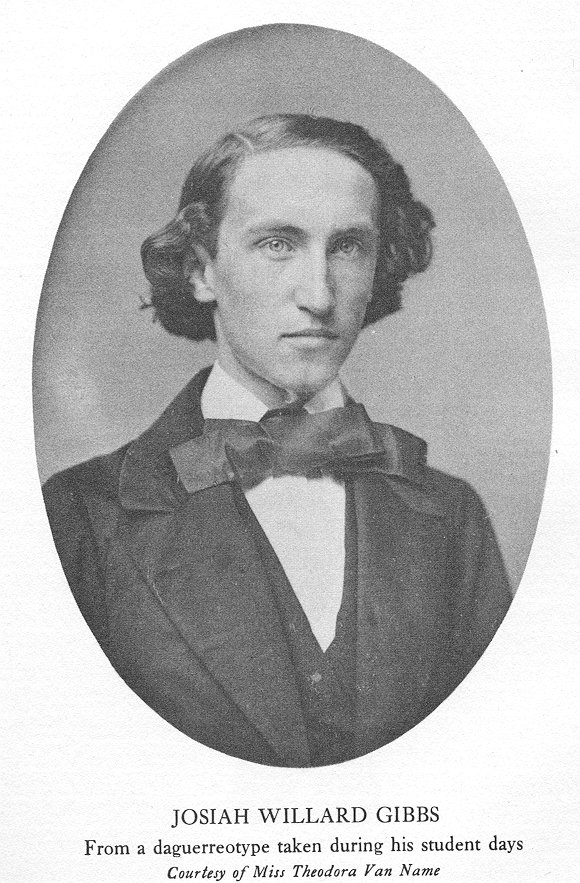
Willard Gibbs as a young man

Gibbs was born in New Haven, Connecticut. He belonged to an old Yankee family that had produced distinguished American clergymen and academics since the 17th century. He was the fourth of five children and the only son of Josiah Willard Gibbs Sr. and his wife Mary Anna, née Van Cleve. On his father's side, he was descended from Samuel Willard, who served as acting President of Harvard College from 1701 to 1707. On his mother's side, one of his ancestors was the Rev. Jonathan Dickinson, the first president of the College of New Jersey (later Princeton University). Gibbs's given name, which he shared with his father and several other members of his extended family, derived from his ancestor Josiah Willard, who had been Secretary of the Province of Massachusetts Bay in the 18th century. His paternal grandmother, Mercy (Prescott) Gibbs, was the sister of Rebecca Minot Prescott Sherman, the wife of American founding father Roger Sherman; and he was the second cousin of Roger Sherman Baldwin (see the Amistad case below).

The elder Gibbs was generally known to his family and colleagues as "Josiah", while the son was called "Willard". Josiah Gibbs was a linguist and theologian who served as professor of sacred literature at Yale Divinity School from 1824 until his death in 1861. He is chiefly remembered today as the abolitionist who found an interpreter for the African passengers of the ship Amistad, allowing them to testify during the trial that followed their rebellion against being sold as slaves.

=== Education ===
Willard Gibbs was educated at the Hopkins School and entered Yale College in 1854 at the age of 15. At Yale, Gibbs received prizes for excellence in mathematics and Latin, and he graduated in 1858, near the top of his class. He remained at Yale as a graduate student at the Sheffield Scientific School. At age 19, soon after his graduation from college, Gibbs was inducted into the Connecticut Academy of Arts and Sciences, a scholarly institution composed primarily of members of the Yale faculty.

Relatively few documents from the period survive and it is difficult to reconstruct the details of Gibbs's early career with precision. In the opinion of biographers, Gibbs's principal mentor and champion, both at Yale and in the Connecticut Academy, was probably the astronomer and mathematician Hubert Anson Newton, a leading authority on meteors, who remained Gibbs's lifelong friend and confidant. After the death of his father in 1861, Gibbs inherited enough money to make him financially independent.

Recurrent pulmonary trouble ailed the young Gibbs and his physicians were concerned that he might be susceptible to tuberculosis, which had killed his mother. He also suffered from astigmatism, whose treatment was then still largely unfamiliar to oculists, so that Gibbs had to diagnose himself and grind his own lenses. Though in later years he used glasses only for reading or other close work, Gibbs's delicate health and imperfect eyesight probably explain why he did not volunteer to fight in the Civil War of 1861–65. He was not conscripted and he remained at Yale for the duration of the war.

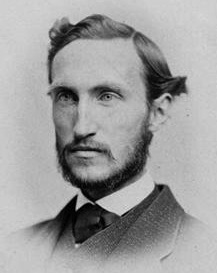
Gibbs during his time as a tutor at Yale

In 1863, Gibbs received the first Doctorate of Philosophy (PhD) in engineering granted in the US, for a thesis entitled "On the Form of the Teeth of Wheels in Spur Gearing", in which he used geometrical techniques to investigate the optimum design for gears. In 1861, Yale had become the first US university to offer a PhD degree and Gibbs's was only the fifth PhD granted in the US in any subject.

=== Career, 1863–1873 ===
After graduation, Gibbs was appointed as tutor at the college for a term of three years. During the first two years, he taught Latin, and during the third year, he taught "natural philosophy" (i.e., physics). In 1866, he patented a design for a railway brake and read a paper before the Connecticut Academy, entitled "The Proper Magnitude of the Units of Length", in which he proposed a scheme for rationalizing the system of units of measurement used in mechanics.

After his term as tutor ended, Gibbs traveled to Europe with his sisters. They spent the winter of 1866–67 in Paris, where Gibbs attended lectures at the Sorbonne and the Collège de France, given by such distinguished mathematical scientists as Joseph Liouville and Michel Chasles. Having undertaken a punishing regimen of study, Gibbs caught a serious cold and a doctor, fearing tuberculosis, advised him to rest on the Riviera, where he and his sisters spent several months and where he made a full recovery.

Moving to Berlin, Gibbs attended the lectures taught by mathematicians Karl Weierstrass and Leopold Kronecker, as well as by chemist Heinrich Gustav Magnus. In August 1867, Gibbs's sister Julia was married in Berlin to Addison Van Name, who had been Gibbs's classmate at Yale. The newly married couple returned to New Haven, leaving Gibbs and his sister Anna in Germany. In Heidelberg, Gibbs was exposed to the work of physicists Gustav Kirchhoff and Hermann von Helmholtz, and chemist Robert Bunsen. At the time, German academics were the leading authorities in the natural sciences, especially chemistry and thermodynamics.

Gibbs returned to Yale in June 1869 and briefly taught French to engineering students. It was probably also around this time that he worked on a new design for a steam-engine governor, his last significant investigation in mechanical engineering. In 1871, he was appointed Professor of Mathematical Physics at Yale, the first such professorship in the United States. Gibbs, who had independent means and had yet to publish anything, was assigned to teach graduate students exclusively and was hired without salary.

=== Career, 1873–1880 ===
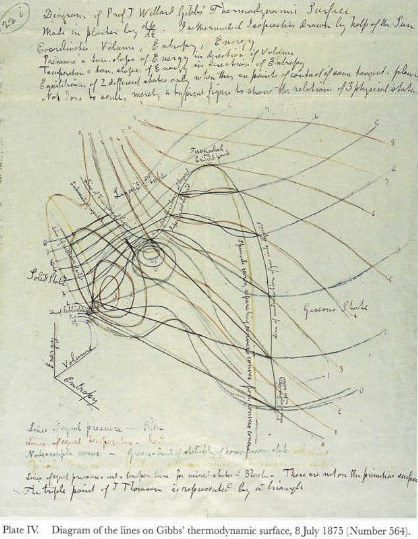
Maxwell's sketch of the lines of constant temperature and pressure, made in preparation for his construction of a solid model based on Gibbs's definition of a thermodynamic surface for water (see Maxwell's thermodynamic surface)

Gibbs published his first work in 1873. His papers on the geometric representation of thermodynamic quantities appeared in the Transactions of the Connecticut Academy. These papers introduced the use of different type phase diagrams, which were his favorite aids to the imagination process when doing research, rather than the mechanical models, such as the ones that Maxwell used in constructing his electromagnetic theory, which might not completely represent their corresponding phenomena. Although the journal had few readers capable of understanding Gibbs's work, he shared reprints with correspondents in Europe and received an enthusiastic response from James Clerk Maxwell at Cambridge. Maxwell even made, with his own hands, a clay model illustrating Gibbs's construct. He then produced two plaster casts of his model and mailed one to Gibbs. That cast is on display at the Yale physics department.

Maxwell included a chapter on Gibbs's work in the next edition of his Theory of Heat, published in 1875. He explained the usefulness of Gibbs's graphical methods in a lecture to the Chemical Society of London and even referred to it in the article on "Diagrams" that he wrote for the Encyclopædia Britannica. Prospects of collaboration between him and Gibbs were cut short by Maxwell's early death in 1879, aged 48. The joke later circulated in New Haven that "only one man lived who could understand Gibbs's papers. That was Maxwell, and now he is dead."

Gibbs then extended his thermodynamic analysis to multi-phase chemical systems (i.e., to systems composed of more than one form of matter) and considered a variety of concrete applications. He described that research in a monograph titled "On the Equilibrium of Heterogeneous Substances", published by the Connecticut Academy in two parts that appeared respectively in 1875 and 1878. That work, which covers about three hundred pages and contains exactly seven hundred numbered mathematical equations, begins with a quotation from Rudolf Clausius that expresses what would later be called the first and second laws of thermodynamics: "The energy of the world is constant. The entropy of the world tends towards a maximum."

Gibbs's monograph rigorously and ingeniously applied his thermodynamic techniques to the interpretation of physico-chemical phenomena, explaining and relating what had previously been a mass of isolated facts and observations. The work has been described as "the Principia of thermodynamics" and as a work of "practically unlimited scope". It solidly laid the foundation for physical Chemistry. Wilhelm Ostwald, who translated Gibbs's monograph into German, referred to Gibbs as the "founder of chemical energetics". According to modern commentators,

It is universally recognised that its publication was an event of the first importance in the history of chemistry ... Nevertheless it was a number of years before its value was generally known, this delay was due largely to the fact that its mathematical form and rigorous deductive processes make it difficult reading for anyone, and especially so for students of experimental chemistry whom it most concerns.

— J. J. O'Connor and E. F. Robertson, 1997

Gibbs continued to work without pay until 1880, when the new Johns Hopkins University in Baltimore, Maryland offered him a position paying $3,000 per year. In response, Yale offered him an annual salary of $2,000, which he was content to accept.

In 1879, Gibbs derived the Gibbs–Appell equation of motion, rediscovered in 1900 by Paul Émile Appell.

=== Career, 1880–1903 ===
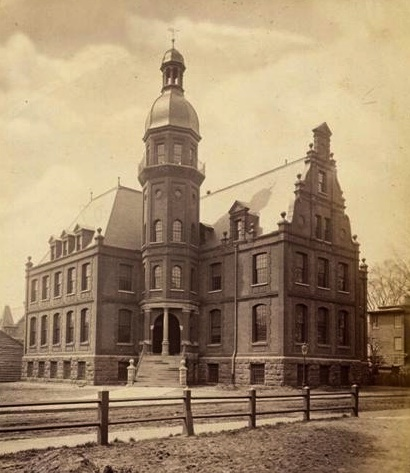
Yale's Sloane Physical Laboratory, as it stood between 1882 and 1931 at the current location of Jonathan Edwards College. Gibbs's office was on the second floor, to the right of the tower in the picture.

From 1880 to 1884, Gibbs worked on developing the exterior algebra of Hermann Grassmann into a vector calculus well-suited to the needs of physicists. With this object in mind, Gibbs distinguished between the dot and cross products of two vectors and introduced the concept of dyadics. Similar work was carried out independently, and at around the same time, by the British mathematical physicist and engineer Oliver Heaviside. Gibbs sought to convince other physicists of the convenience of the vectorial approach over the quaternionic calculus of William Rowan Hamilton, which was then widely used by British scientists. This led him, in the early 1890s, to a controversy with Peter Guthrie Tait and others in the pages of Nature.

Gibbs's lecture notes on vector calculus were privately printed in 1881 and 1884 for the use of his students, and were later adapted by Edwin Bidwell Wilson into a textbook, Vector Analysis, published in 1901. That book helped to popularize the "del" notation that is widely used today in electrodynamics and fluid mechanics. In other mathematical work, he re-discovered the "Gibbs phenomenon" in the theory of Fourier series (which, unbeknownst to him and to later scholars, had been described fifty years before by an obscure English mathematician, Henry Wilbraham).

The sine integral function, which gives the overshoot associated with the Gibbs phenomenon for the Fourier series of a step function on the real line

From 1882 to 1889, Gibbs wrote five papers on physical optics, in which he investigated birefringence and other optical phenomena and defended Maxwell's electromagnetic theory of light against the mechanical theories of Lord Kelvin and others. In his work on optics, just as much as in his work on thermodynamics, Gibbs deliberately avoided speculating about the microscopic structure of matter and purposefully confined his research problems to those that can be solved from broad general principles and experimentally confirmed facts. The methods that he used were highly original and the obtained results showed decisively the correctness of Maxwell's electromagnetic theory.

Gibbs coined the term statistical mechanics and introduced key concepts in the corresponding mathematical description of physical systems, including the notions of chemical potential (1876) and statistical ensemble (1902). Gibbs's derivation of the laws of thermodynamics from the statistical properties of systems consisting of many particles was presented in his highly influential textbook Elementary Principles in Statistical Mechanics, published in 1902, a year before his death.

Gibbs's retiring personality and intense focus on his work limited his accessibility to students. His principal protégé was Edwin Bidwell Wilson, who nonetheless explained that "except in the classroom I saw very little of Gibbs. He had a way, toward the end of the afternoon, of taking a stroll about the streets between his study in the old Sloane Laboratory and his home—a little exercise between work and dinner—and one might occasionally come across him at that time." Gibbs did supervise the doctoral thesis on mathematical economics written by Irving Fisher in 1891. After Gibbs's death, Fisher financed the publication of his Collected Works. Another distinguished student was Lee De Forest, later a pioneer of radio technology.

Gibbs died in New Haven on April 28, 1903, at the age of 64, the victim of an acute intestinal obstruction. A funeral was conducted two days later at his home on 121 High Street, and his body was buried in the nearby Grove Street Cemetery. In May, Yale organized a memorial meeting at the Sloane Laboratory. The eminent British physicist J. J. Thomson was in attendance and delivered a brief address.

=== Personal life and character ===
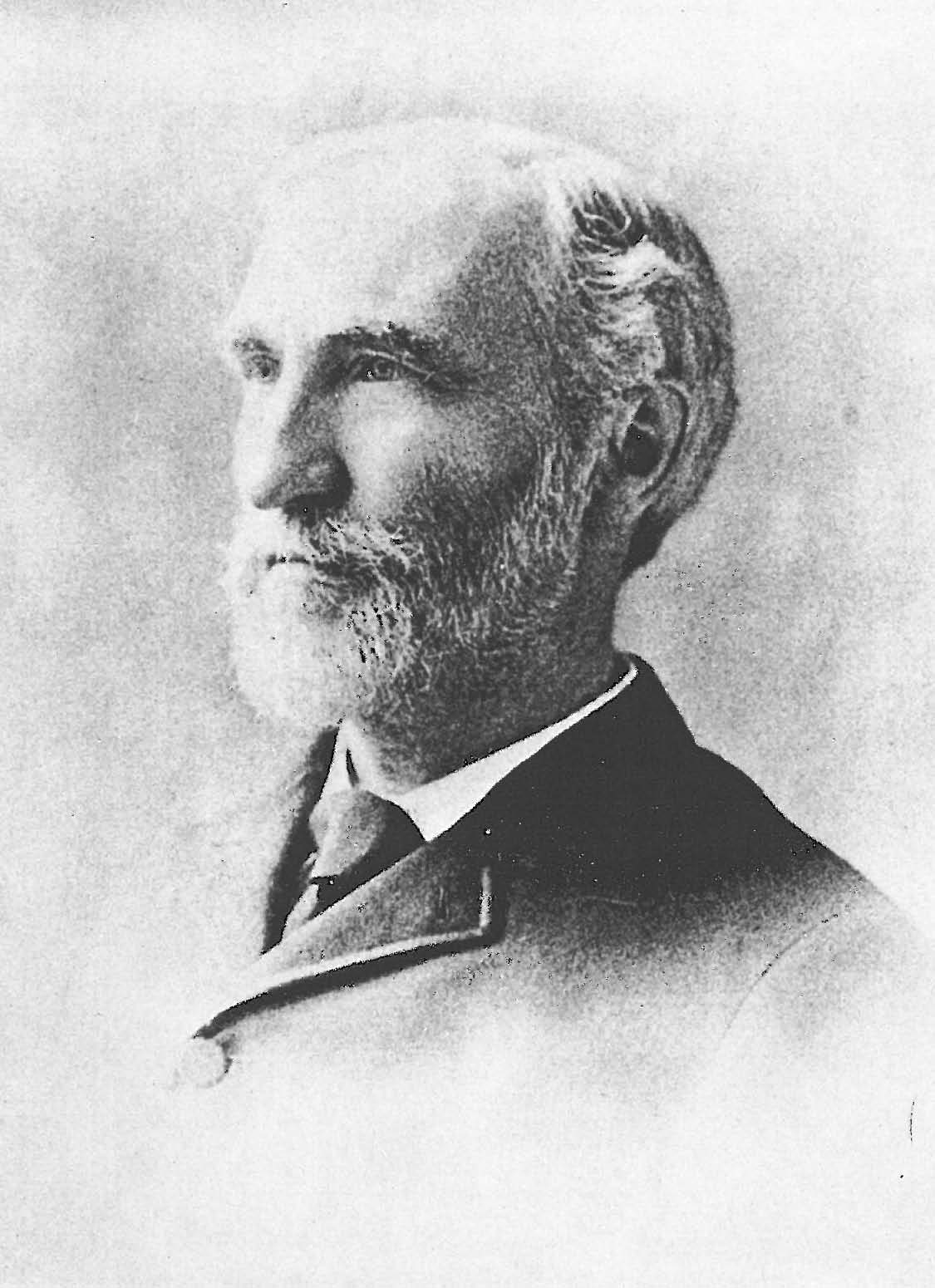
Photograph taken around 1895. According to his student Lynde Wheeler, of the existing portraits, this is the most faithful to Gibbs's kindly habitual expression.

Gibbs never married, living all his life in his childhood home with his sister Julia and her husband Addison Van Name, who was the Yale librarian. Except for his customary summer vacations in the Adirondacks (at Keene Valley, New York) and later at the White Mountains (in Intervale, New Hampshire), his sojourn in Europe in 1866–1869 was almost the only time that Gibbs spent outside New Haven. He joined Yale's College Church (a Congregational church) at the end of his freshman year and remained a regular attendant for the rest of his life. Gibbs generally voted for the Republican candidate in presidential elections but, like other "Mugwumps", his concern over the growing corruption associated with machine politics led him to support Grover Cleveland, a conservative Democrat, in the election of 1884. Little else is known of his religious or political views, which he mostly kept to himself.

Gibbs did not produce a substantial personal correspondence, and many of his letters were later lost or destroyed. Beyond the technical writings concerning his research, he published only two other pieces: a brief obituary for Rudolf Clausius, one of the founders of the mathematical theory of thermodynamics, and a longer biographical memoir of his mentor at Yale, H. A. Newton. In Edward Bidwell Wilson's view,

Gibbs was not an advertiser for personal renown nor a propagandist for science; he was a scholar, scion of an old scholarly family, living before the days when research had become résearch ... Gibbs was not a freak, he had no striking ways, he was a kindly dignified gentleman.

— E. B. Wilson, 1931

According to Lynde Wheeler, who had been Gibbs's student at Yale, in his later years Gibbs

was always neatly dressed, usually wore a felt hat on the street, and never exhibited any of the physical mannerisms or eccentricities sometimes thought to be inseparable from genius ... His manner was cordial without being effusive and conveyed clearly the innate simplicity and sincerity of his nature.

— Lynde Wheeler, 1951

He was a careful investor and financial manager, and at his death in 1903 his estate was valued at $100,000 (roughly $3.58 million today). For many years, he served as trustee, secretary, and treasurer of his alma mater, the Hopkins School. US President Chester A. Arthur appointed him as one of the commissioners to the National Conference of Electricians, which convened in Philadelphia in September 1884, and Gibbs presided over one of its sessions. A keen and skilled horseman, Gibbs was seen habitually in New Haven driving his sister's carriage. In an obituary published in the American Journal of Science, Gibbs's former student Henry A. Bumstead referred to Gibbs's personal character:

Unassuming in manner, genial and kindly in his intercourse with his fellow-men, never showing impatience or irritation, devoid of personal ambition of the baser sort or of the slightest desire to exalt himself, he went far toward realizing the ideal of the unselfish, Christian gentleman. In the minds of those who knew him, the greatness of his intellectual achievements will never overshadow the beauty and dignity of his life.

— H. A. Bumstead, 1903

== Major scientific contributions ==
=== Chemical and electrochemical thermodynamics ===
Graphical representation of the free energy of a body, from the latter of the papers published by Gibbs in 1873. This shows a plane of constant volume, passing through the point A that represents the body's initial state. The curve MN is the section of the "surface of dissipated energy". AD and AE are, respectively, the energy (ε) and entropy (η) of the initial state. AB is the "available energy" (now called the Helmholtz free energy) and AC the "capacity for entropy" (i.e., the amount by which the entropy can be increased without changing the energy or volume).

Gibbs's papers from the 1870s introduced the idea of expressing the internal energy U of a system in terms of the entropy S, in addition to the usual state variables of volume V, pressure p, and temperature T. He also introduced the concept of the chemical potential $\mu$ of a given chemical species, defined to be the rate of the increase in U associated with the increase in the number N of molecules of that species (at constant entropy and volume). Thus, it was Gibbs who first combined the first and second laws of thermodynamics by expressing the infinitesimal change in the internal energy, dU, of a closed system in the form

$$\mathrm{d}U = T\mathrm{d}S - p \,\mathrm{d}V + \sum_i \mu_i \,\mathrm{d} N_i,$$

where T is the absolute temperature, p is the pressure, dS is an infinitesimal change in entropy and dV is an infinitesimal change of volume. The last term is the sum, over all the chemical species in a chemical reaction, of the chemical potential, μ_{i}, of the i-th species, multiplied by the infinitesimal change in the number of moles, dN_{i} of that species. By taking the Legendre transform of this expression, he defined the concepts of enthalpy H and Gibbs free energy G:

$$G_{(p,T)} = H - TS.$$

This compares to the expression for Helmholtz free energy A:

$$A_{(v,T)} = U - TS.$$

When the Gibbs free energy for a chemical reaction is negative, the reaction will proceed spontaneously. When a chemical system is at equilibrium, the change in Gibbs free energy is zero. An equilibrium constant is simply related to the free energy change when the reactants are in their standard states:

$$\Delta G^\ominus = -RT \ln K^\ominus.$$

Chemical potential is usually defined as partial molar Gibbs free energy:

$$\mu_i = \left(\frac{\partial G}{\partial N_i}\right)_{T,P,N_{j\neq i}}.$$

Gibbs also obtained what later came to be known as the "Gibbs–Duhem equation".

In an electrochemical reaction characterized by an electromotive force ℰ and an amount of transferred charge Q, Gibbs's starting equation becomes

$$\mathrm{d}U = T\mathrm{d}S - p \,\mathrm{d}V + \mathcal{E}\mathrm{d}Q.$$

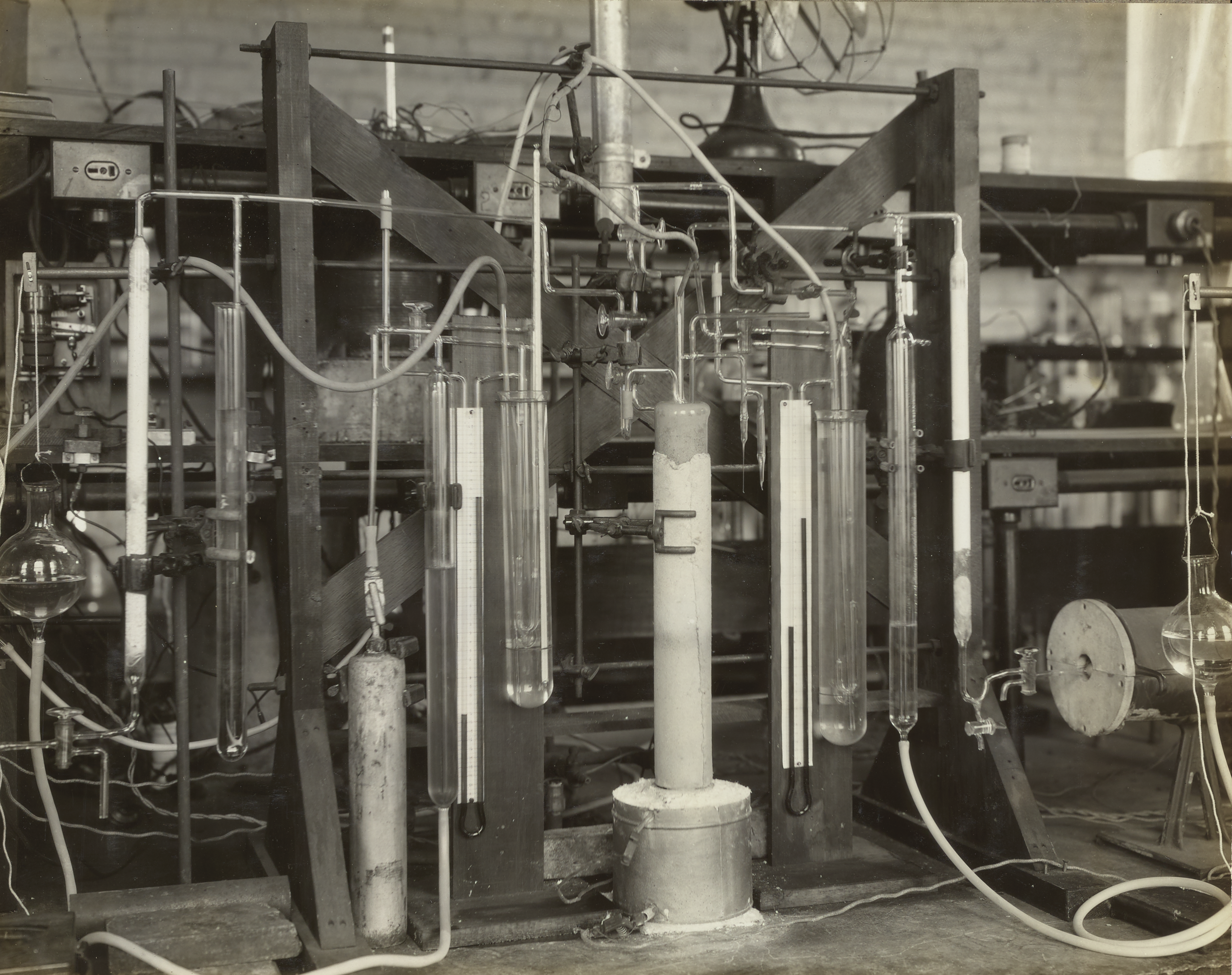
Apparatus for investigating the phase rule of an iron–nitrogen system, U.S. Fixed Nitrogen Research Laboratory, 1930

The publication of the paper "On the Equilibrium of Heterogeneous Substances" (1874–1878) is now regarded as a landmark in the development of chemistry. In it, Gibbs developed a rigorous mathematical theory for various transport phenomena, including adsorption, electrochemistry, and the Marangoni effect in fluid mixtures. He also formulated the phase rule

$$F = C - P + 2$$

for the number F of variables that may be independently controlled in an equilibrium mixture of C components existing in P phases. The phase rule is very useful in diverse areas, such as metallurgy, mineralogy, and petrology. It can also be applied to various research problems in physical chemistry.

=== Statistical mechanics ===
Together with James Clerk Maxwell and Ludwig Boltzmann, Gibbs founded "statistical mechanics", a term that he coined to identify the branch of theoretical physics that accounts for the observed thermodynamic properties of systems in terms of the statistics of ensembles of all possible physical states of a system composed of many particles. He introduced the concept of "phase of a mechanical system". (Note: For a mechanical system composed of n particles, the phase is represented by a point in a 2n-dimensional space, which he called "extension-in-phase" and is equivalent to our modern notion of phase space. However, the phrase "phase space" was not invented by him.) He used the concept to define the microcanonical, canonical, and grand canonical ensembles; all related to the Gibbs measure, thus obtaining a more general formulation of the statistical properties of many-particle systems than Maxwell and Boltzmann had achieved before him.

Gibbs generalized Boltzmann's statistical interpretation of entropy $S$ by defining the entropy of an arbitrary ensemble as

$$S = -k_\text{B}\,\sum_i p_i \ln p_i,$$

where $k_\text{B}$ is the Boltzmann constant, while the sum is over all possible microstates $i$, with $p_i$ the corresponding probability of the microstate (see Gibbs entropy formula). This same formula would later play a central role in Claude Shannon's information theory and is therefore often seen as the basis of the modern information-theoretical interpretation of thermodynamics.

According to Henri Poincaré, writing in 1904, even though Maxwell and Boltzmann had previously explained the irreversibility of macroscopic physical processes in probabilistic terms, "the one who has seen it most clearly, in a book too little read because it is a little difficult to read, is Gibbs, in his Elementary Principles of Statistical Mechanics". Gibbs's analysis of irreversibility, and his formulation of Boltzmann's H-theorem and of the ergodic hypothesis, were major influences on the mathematical physics of the 20th century.

Gibbs was well aware that the application of the equipartition theorem to large systems of classical particles failed to explain the measurements of the specific heats of both solids and gases, and he argued that this was evidence of the danger of basing thermodynamics on "hypotheses about the constitution of matter". Gibbs's own framework for statistical mechanics, based on ensembles of macroscopically indistinguishable microstates, could be carried over almost intact after the discovery that the microscopic laws of nature obey quantum rules, rather than the classical laws known to Gibbs and to his contemporaries. His resolution of the so-called "Gibbs paradox", about the entropy of the mixing of gases, is now often cited as a prefiguration of the indistinguishability of particles required by quantum physics.

=== Vector analysis ===
Diagram showing the magnitude and direction of the cross product of two vectors, in the notation introduced by Gibbs

British scientists, including Maxwell, had relied on Hamilton's quaternions in order to express the dynamics of physical quantities, like the electric and magnetic fields, having both a magnitude and a direction in three-dimensional space. Following W. K. Clifford in his Elements of Dynamic (1878), Gibbs noted that the product of quaternions could be separated into two parts: a one-dimensional (scalar) quantity and a three-dimensional vector, so that the use of quaternions involved mathematical complications and redundancies that could be avoided in the interest of simplicity and to facilitate teaching. In his Yale classroom notes he defined two distinct types of products for a pair of vectors: a dot product (or scalar product) and a cross product (or skew or vector product). He also introduced the now common notation for them. Through the 1901 textbook Vector Analysis prepared by E. B. Wilson from Gibbs notes, he was largely responsible for the development of the vector calculus techniques still used today in electrodynamics and fluid mechanics.

While he was working on vector analysis in the late 1870s, Gibbs discovered that his approach was similar to the one that Grassmann had taken in his "multiple algebra". Gibbs then sought to publicize Grassmann's work, stressing that it was both more general and historically prior to Hamilton's quaternionic algebra. To establish priority of Grassmann's ideas, Gibbs convinced Grassmann's heirs to seek the publication in Germany of the essay "Theorie der Ebbe und Flut" on tides that Grassmann had submitted in 1840 to the faculty at the University of Berlin, in which he had first introduced the notion of what would later be called a vector space (linear space).

As Gibbs had advocated in the 1880s and 1890s, quaternions were eventually all but abandoned by physicists in favor of the vectorial approach developed by him and, independently, by Oliver Heaviside. Gibbs applied his vector methods to the determination of planetary and comet orbits. He also developed the concept of mutually reciprocal triads of vectors that later proved to be of importance in crystallography.

=== Physical optics ===
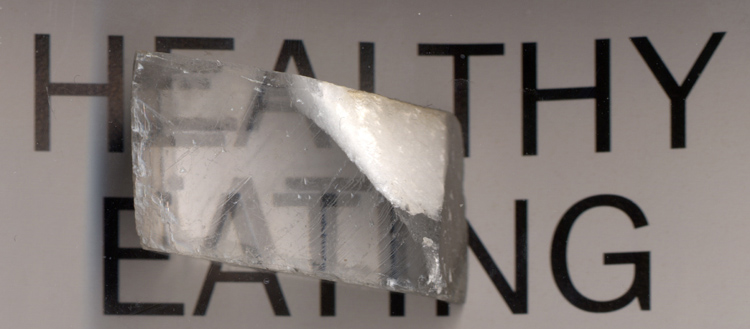
A calcite crystal produces birefringence (or "double refraction") of light, a phenomenon which Gibbs explained using Maxwell's equations for electromagnetic phenomena.

Though Gibbs's research on physical optics is less well known today than his other work, it made a significant contribution to classical electromagnetism by applying Maxwell's equations to the theory of optical processes such as birefringence, dispersion, and optical activity. In that work, Gibbs showed that those processes could be accounted for by Maxwell's equations without any special assumptions about the microscopic structure of matter or about the nature of the medium in which electromagnetic waves were supposed to propagate (the so-called luminiferous ether). Gibbs also stressed that the absence of a longitudinal electromagnetic wave, which is needed to account for the observed properties of light, is automatically guaranteed by Maxwell's equations (by virtue of what is now called their "gauge invariance"), whereas in mechanical theories of light, such as Lord Kelvin's, it must be imposed as an ad hoc condition on the properties of the aether.

In his last paper on physical optics, Gibbs concluded that

it may be said for the electrical theory [of light] that it is not obliged to invent hypotheses, but only to apply the laws furnished by the science of electricity, and that it is difficult to account for the coincidences between the electrical and optical properties of media unless we regard the motions of light as electrical.

— J. W. Gibbs, 1889

Shortly afterwards, the electromagnetic nature of light was demonstrated by the experiments of Heinrich Hertz in Germany.

== Scientific recognition ==
Gibbs worked at a time when there was little tradition of rigorous theoretical science in the United States. His research was not easily understandable to his students or his colleagues, and he made no effort to popularize his ideas or to simplify their exposition to make them more accessible. His seminal work on thermodynamics was published mostly in the Transactions of the Connecticut Academy, a journal edited by his librarian brother-in-law, which was little read in the US and even less so in Europe. When Gibbs submitted his long paper on the equilibrium of heterogeneous substances to the academy, both Elias Loomis and H. A. Newton protested that they did not understand Gibbs's work at all, but they helped to raise the money needed to pay for the typesetting of the many mathematical symbols in the paper. Several Yale faculty members, as well as business and professional men in New Haven, contributed funds for that purpose.

Even though it had been immediately embraced by Maxwell, Gibbs's graphical formulation of the laws of thermodynamics came into widespread use only in the mid 20th century, with the work of László Tisza and Herbert Callen. According to James Gerald Crowther,

in his later years [Gibbs] was a tall, dignified gentleman, with a healthy stride and ruddy complexion, performing his share of household chores, approachable and kind (if unintelligible) to students. Gibbs was highly esteemed by his friends, but American science was too preoccupied with practical questions to make much use of his profound theoretical work during his lifetime. He lived out his quiet life at Yale, deeply admired by a few able students but making no immediate impress on American science commensurate with his genius.

— J. G. Crowther, 1937

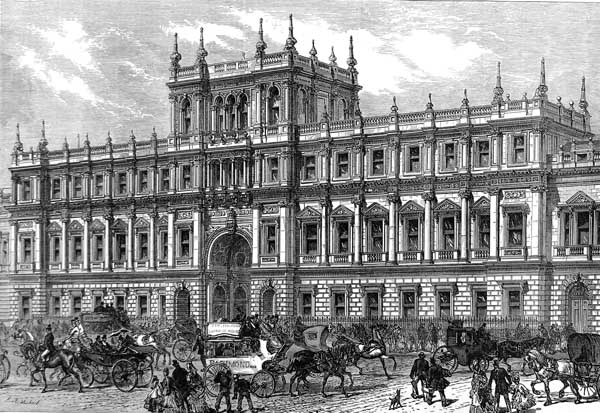
Burlington House, site of the Royal Society of London, in 1873

On the other hand, Gibbs did receive the major honors then possible for an academic scientist in the US. He was elected to the National Academy of Sciences in 1879 and received the 1880 Rumford Prize from the American Academy of Arts and Sciences for his work on chemical thermodynamics. In 1895, he was elected to the American Philosophical Society in 1895. He was also awarded honorary doctorates by Princeton University and Williams College.

In Europe, Gibbs was inducted as honorary member of the London Mathematical Society in 1892 and elected Foreign Member of the Royal Society in 1897. He was elected as corresponding member of the Prussian and French Academies of Science and received honorary doctorates from the universities of Dublin, Erlangen, and Christiania (now Oslo). The Royal Society further honored Gibbs in 1901 with the Copley Medal, then regarded as the highest international award in the natural sciences, noting that he had been "the first to apply the second law of thermodynamics to the exhaustive discussion of the relation between chemical, electrical and thermal energy and capacity for external work." Gibbs, who remained in New Haven, was represented at the award ceremony by Commander Richardson Clover, the US naval attaché in London.

In his autobiography, mathematician Gian-Carlo Rota tells of casually browsing the mathematical stacks of Sterling Library and stumbling on a handwritten mailing list, attached to some of Gibbs's course notes, which listed over two hundred notable scientists of his day, including Poincaré, Boltzmann, David Hilbert, and Ernst Mach. From this, Rota concluded that Gibbs's work was better known among the scientific elite of his day than the published material suggests. Lynde Wheeler reproduces that mailing list in an appendix to his biography of Gibbs. That Gibbs succeeded in interesting his European correspondents in his work is demonstrated by the fact that his monograph "On the Equilibrium of Heterogeneous Substances" was translated into German (then the leading language for chemistry) by Wilhelm Ostwald in 1892 and into French by Henri Louis Le Châtelier in 1899.

== Influence ==
Gibbs's most immediate and obvious influence was on physical chemistry and statistical mechanics, two disciplines which he greatly helped to found. During Gibbs's lifetime, his phase rule was experimentally validated by Dutch chemist H. W. Bakhuis Roozeboom, who showed how to apply it in a variety of situations, thereby assuring it of widespread use. In industrial chemistry, Gibbs's thermodynamics found many applications during the early 20th century, from electrochemistry to the development of the Haber process for the synthesis of ammonia.

When Dutch physicist J. D. van der Waals received the 1910 Nobel Prize "for his work on the equation of state for gases and liquids" he acknowledged the great influence of Gibbs's work on that subject. Max Planck received the 1918 Nobel Prize for his work on quantum mechanics, particularly his 1900 paper on Planck's law for quantized black-body radiation. That work was based largely on the thermodynamics of Kirchhoff, Boltzmann, and Gibbs. Planck declared that Gibbs's name "not only in America but in the whole world will ever be reckoned among the most renowned theoretical physicists of all times."

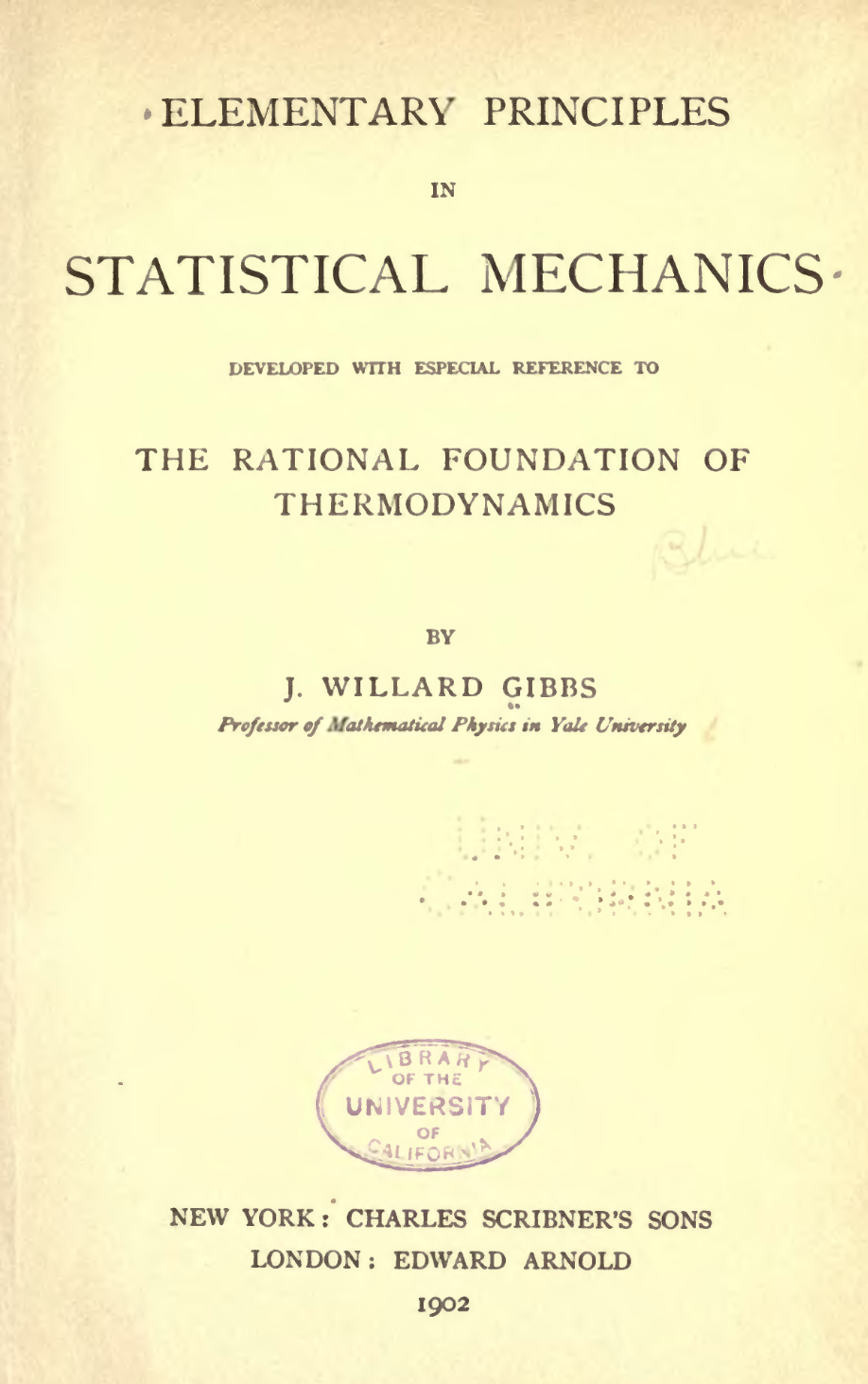
Title page of Gibbs's Elementary Principles in Statistical Mechanics, one of the founding documents of that discipline, published in 1902

The first half of the 20th century saw the publication of two influential textbooks that soon came to be regarded as founding documents of chemical thermodynamics, both of which used and extended Gibbs's work in that field: these were Thermodynamics and the Free Energy of Chemical Processes (1923), by Gilbert N. Lewis and Merle Randall, and Modern Thermodynamics by the Methods of Willard Gibbs (1933), by Edward A. Guggenheim.

Chemist Frederick G. Donnan compared Gibbs to epoch-making scientists such as Isaac Newton, Joseph-Louis Lagrange and William Rowan Hamilton, stating:

Gibbs ranks with men like Newton, Lagrange and Hamilton, who by the sheer force and power of their minds have produced those generalized statements of scientific law which mark epochs in the advance of exact knowledge.

Physicist Robert Andrews Millikan compared the work of Gibbs to what Pierre-Simon Laplace and James Clerk Maxwell achieved, stating that:

He did for statistical mechanics and for thermodynamics what Laplace did for celestial mechanics and Maxwell did for electrodynamics, namely, made his field a well-nigh finished theoretical structure.

Gibbs's work on statistical ensembles, as presented in his 1902 textbook, has had a great impact in both theoretical physics and in pure mathematics. According to mathematical physicist Arthur Wightman,

It is one of the striking features of the work of Gibbs, noticed by every student of thermodynamics and statistical mechanics, that his formulations of physical concepts were so felicitously chosen that they have survived 100 years of turbulent development in theoretical physics and mathematics.

— A. S. Wightman, 1990

Initially unaware of Gibbs's contributions in that field, Albert Einstein wrote three papers on statistical mechanics, published between 1902 and 1904. After reading Gibbs's textbook (which was translated into German by Ernst Zermelo in 1905), Einstein declared that Gibbs's treatment was superior to his own and explained that he would not have written those papers if he had known Gibbs's work.

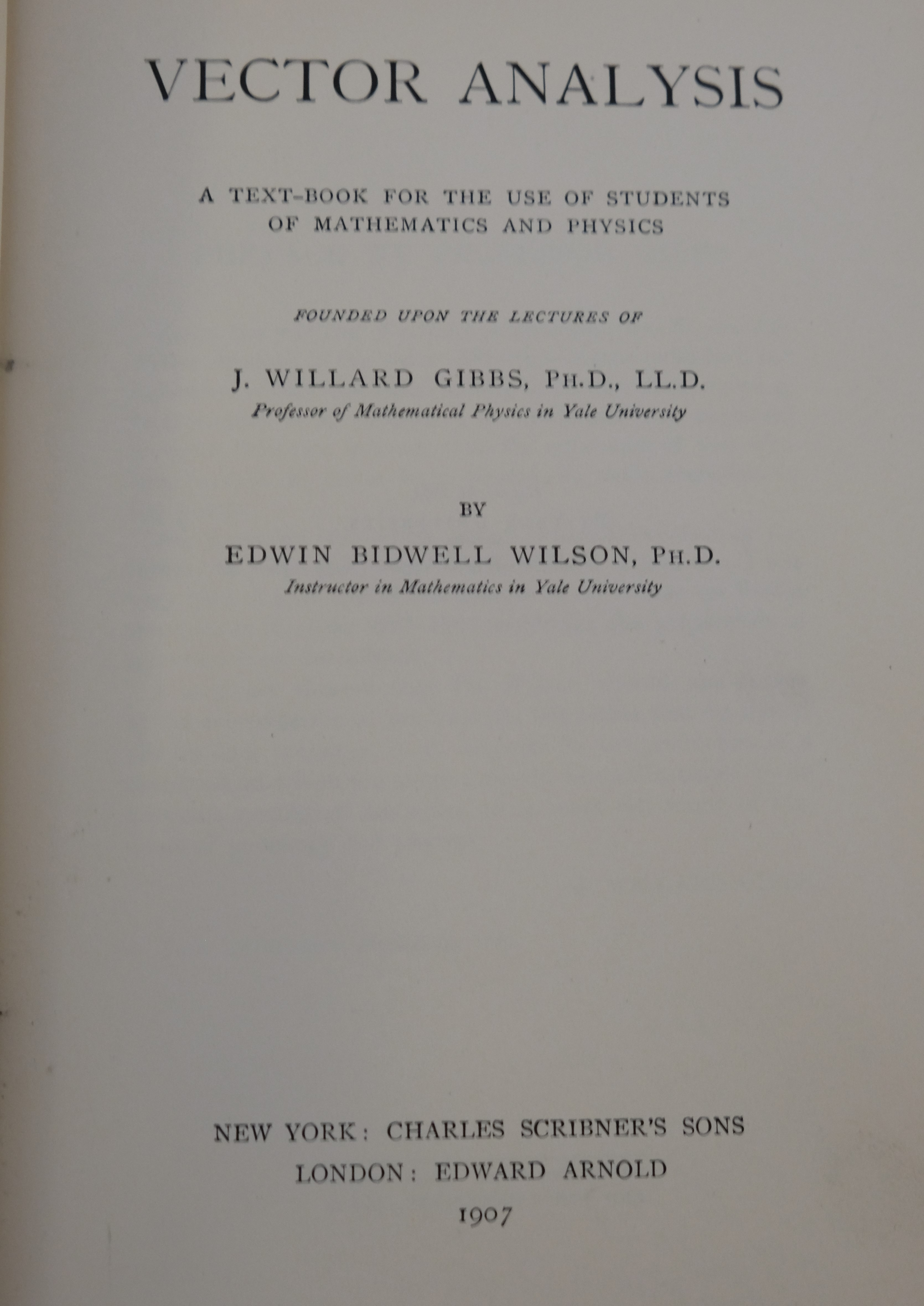
Title page to a 1907 copy of Vector Analysis

Gibbs's early papers on the use of graphical methods in thermodynamics reflect a powerfully original understanding of what mathematicians would later call "convex analysis", including ideas that, according to Barry Simon, "lay dormant for about seventy-five years". Important mathematical concepts based on Gibbs's work on thermodynamics and statistical mechanics include the Gibbs lemma in game theory, the Gibbs inequality in information theory, as well as Gibbs sampling in computational statistics.

The development of vector calculus was Gibbs's other great contribution to mathematics. The publication in 1901 of E. B. Wilson's textbook Vector Analysis, based on Gibbs's lectures at Yale, did much to propagate the use of vectorial methods and notation in both mathematics and theoretical physics, definitively displacing the quaternions that had until then been dominant in the scientific literature.

At Yale, Gibbs was also mentor to Lee De Forest, who went on to invent the triode amplifier and has been called the "father of radio". De Forest credited Gibbs's influence for the realization "that the leaders in electrical development would be those who pursued the higher theory of waves and oscillations and the transmission by these means of intelligence and power." Another student of Gibbs who played a significant role in the development of radio technology was Lynde Wheeler.

Gibbs also had an indirect influence on mathematical economics. He supervised the thesis of Irving Fisher, who received the first PhD in economics from Yale in 1891. In that work, published in 1892 as Mathematical Investigations in the Theory of Value and Prices, Fisher drew a direct analogy between Gibbsian equilibrium in physical and chemical systems, and the general equilibrium of markets, and he used Gibbs's vectorial notation. Gibbs's protégé Edwin Bidwell Wilson became, in turn, a mentor to leading American economist and Nobel Laureate Paul Samuelson. In 1947, Samuelson published Foundations of Economic Analysis, based on his doctoral dissertation, in which he used as epigraph a remark attributed to Gibbs: "Mathematics is a language." Samuelson later explained that in his understanding of prices his "debts were not primarily to Pareto or Slutsky, but to the great thermodynamicist, Willard Gibbs of Yale."

Mathematician Norbert Wiener cited Gibbs's use of probability in the formulation of statistical mechanics as "the first great revolution of twentieth century physics" and as a major influence on his conception of cybernetics. Wiener explained in the preface to his book The Human Use of Human Beings that it was "devoted to the impact of the Gibbsian point of view on modern life, both through the substantive changes it has made to working science, and through the changes it has made indirectly in our attitude to life in general."

== Commemoration ==
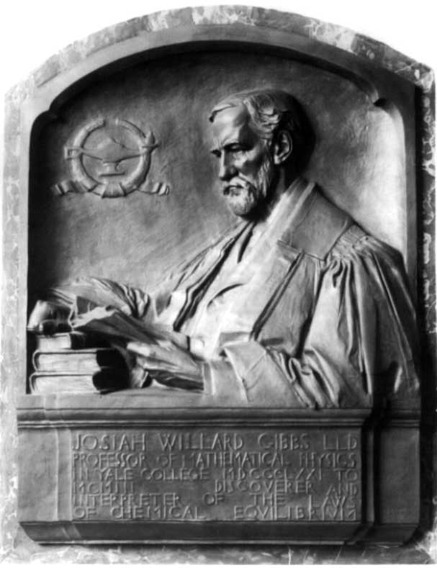
Bronze memorial tablet, originally installed in 1912 at the Sloane Physics Laboratory, now at the entrance to the Josiah Willard Gibbs Laboratories, Yale University

When the German physical chemist Walther Nernst visited Yale in 1906 to give the Silliman lecture, he was surprised to find no tangible memorial for Gibbs. Nernst donated his $500 lecture fee to the university to help pay for a suitable monument. This was finally unveiled in 1912, in the form of a bronze bas-relief by sculptor Lee Lawrie, installed in the Sloane Physics Laboratory. In 1910, the American Chemical Society established the Willard Gibbs Award for eminent work in pure or applied chemistry. In 1923, the American Mathematical Society endowed the Josiah Willard Gibbs Lectureship, "to show the public some idea of the aspects of mathematics and its applications".

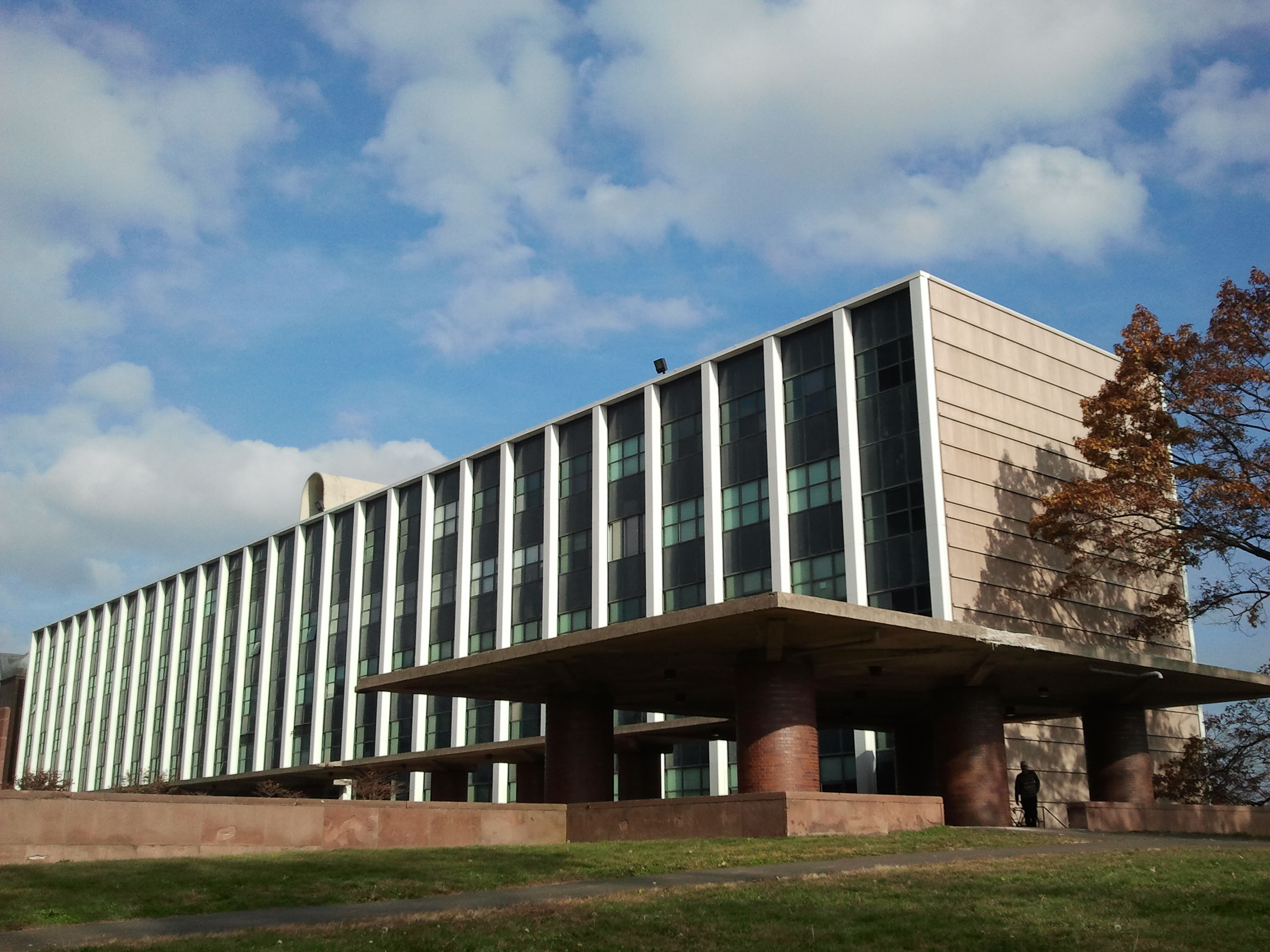
Building housing the Josiah Willard Gibbs Laboratories, at Yale University's Science Hill

In 1945, Yale University created the J. Willard Gibbs Professorship in Theoretical Chemistry, held until 1973 by Lars Onsager. Onsager, who much like Gibbs, focused on applying new mathematical ideas to problems in physical chemistry, won the 1968 Nobel Prize in chemistry. In addition to establishing the Josiah Willard Gibbs Laboratories and the J. Willard Gibbs Assistant Professorship in Mathematics, Yale has also hosted two symposia dedicated to Gibbs's life and work, one in 1989 and another on the centenary of his death, in 2003. Rutgers University endowed a J. Willard Gibbs Professorship of Thermomechanics, held as of 2014 by Bernard Coleman.

Gibbs was elected in 1950 to the Hall of Fame for Great Americans. The oceanographic research ship USNS Josiah Willard Gibbs (T-AGOR-1) was in service with the United States Navy from 1958 to 1971. Gibbs crater, near the eastern limb of the Moon, was named in the scientist's honor in 1964.

Edward Guggenheim introduced the symbol G for the Gibbs free energy in 1933, and this was used also by Dirk ter Haar in 1966. This notation is now universal and is recommended by the IUPAC. In 1960, William Giauque and others suggested the name "gibbs" (abbreviated gbs.) for the unit of entropy calorie per kelvin, but this usage did not become common, and the corresponding SI unit joule per kelvin carries no special name.

In 1954, a year before his death, Albert Einstein was asked by an interviewer who were the greatest thinkers that he had known. Einstein replied: "Lorentz", adding "I never met Willard Gibbs; perhaps, had I done so, I might have placed him beside Lorentz." Author Bill Bryson in his bestselling popular science book A Short History of Nearly Everything ranks Gibbs as "perhaps the most brilliant person that most people have never heard of".

In 1958, USS San Carlos was renamed USNS Josiah Willard Gibbs and re-designated as an oceanographic research ship.

=== In literature ===
In 1909, the American historian and novelist Henry Adams finished an essay entitled "The Rule of Phase Applied to History", in which he sought to apply Gibbs's phase rule and other thermodynamic concepts to a general theory of human history. William James, Henry Bumstead, and others criticized both Adams's tenuous grasp of the scientific concepts that he invoked, as well as the arbitrariness of his application of those concepts as metaphors for the evolution of human thought and society. The essay remained unpublished until it appeared posthumously in 1919, in The Degradation of the Democratic Dogma, edited by Henry Adams's younger brother Brooks.

Cover of the June 1946 issue of Fortune, by artist Arthur Lidov, showing Gibbs's thermodynamic surface of water and his formula for the phase rule

In the 1930s, feminist poet Muriel Rukeyser became fascinated by Willard Gibbs and wrote a long poem about his life and work ("Gibbs", included in the collection A Turning Wind, published in 1939), as well as a book-length biography (Willard Gibbs, 1942). According to Rukeyser:

Willard Gibbs is the type of the imagination at work in the world. His story is that of an opening up which has had its effect on our lives and our thinking; and, it seems to me, it is the emblem of the naked imagination—which is called abstract and impractical, but whose discoveries can be used by anyone who is interested, in whatever "field"—an imagination which for me, more than that of any other figure in American thought, any poet, or political, or religious figure, stands for imagination at its essential points.

— Muriel Rukeyser, 1949

In 1946, Fortune magazine illustrated a cover story on "Fundamental Science" with a representation of the thermodynamic surface that Maxwell had built based on Gibbs's proposal. Rukeyser called this surface a "statue of water" and the magazine saw in it "the abstract creation of a great American scientist that lends itself to the symbolism of contemporary art forms." The artwork by Arthur Lidov also included Gibbs's mathematical expression of the phase rule for heterogeneous mixtures, as well as a radar screen, an oscilloscope waveform, Newton's apple, and a small rendition of a three-dimensional phase diagram.

Gibbs's nephew, Ralph Gibbs Van Name, a professor of physical chemistry at Yale, was unhappy with Rukeyser's biography, in part because of her lack of scientific training. Van Name had withheld the family papers from her and, after her book was published in 1942 to positive literary but mixed scientific reviews, he tried to encourage Gibbs's former students to produce a more technically oriented biography. Rukeyser's approach to Gibbs was also sharply criticized by Gibbs's former student and protégé Edwin Wilson. With Van Name's and Wilson's encouragement, physicist Lynde Wheeler published a new biography of Gibbs in 1951.

Both Gibbs and Rukeyser's biography of him figure prominently in the poetry collection True North (1997) by Stephanie Strickland. In fiction, Gibbs appears as the mentor to character Kit Traverse in Thomas Pynchon's novel Against the Day (2006). That novel also prominently discusses the birefringence of Iceland spar, an optical phenomenon that Gibbs investigated.

=== Gibbs stamp (2005) ===
In 2005, the United States Postal Service issued the American Scientists commemorative postage stamp series designed by artist Victor Stabin, depicting Gibbs, John von Neumann, Barbara McClintock, and Richard Feynman. The first day of issue ceremony for the series was held on May 4 at Yale University's Luce Hall and was attended by John Marburger, scientific advisor to the president of the United States, Rick Levin, president of Yale, and family members of the scientists honored, including physician John W. Gibbs, a distant cousin of Willard Gibbs.

Kenneth R. Jolls, a professor of chemical engineering at Iowa State University and an expert on graphical methods in thermodynamics, consulted on the design of the stamp honoring Gibbs. The stamp identifies Gibbs as a "thermodynamicist" and features a diagram from the 4th edition of Maxwell's Theory of Heat, published in 1875, which illustrates Gibbs's thermodynamic surface for water. Microprinting on the collar of Gibbs's portrait depicts his original mathematical equation for the change in the energy of a substance in terms of its entropy and the other state variables.

== Outline of principal work ==
- Physical chemistry: free energy, phase diagram, phase rule, transport phenomena
- Statistical mechanics: statistical ensemble, phase space, chemical potential, Gibbs entropy, Gibbs paradox
- Mathematics: Vector Analysis, convex analysis, Gibbs phenomenon
- Electromagnetism: Maxwell's equations, birefringence

== See also ==
- Concentration of measure in physics
- Thermodynamics of crystal growth
- Governor (device)
- List of notable textbooks in statistical mechanics
- List of theoretical physicists
- List of things named after Josiah W. Gibbs
- Timeline of United States discoveries
- Timeline of thermodynamics
