= Gibbs lemma =

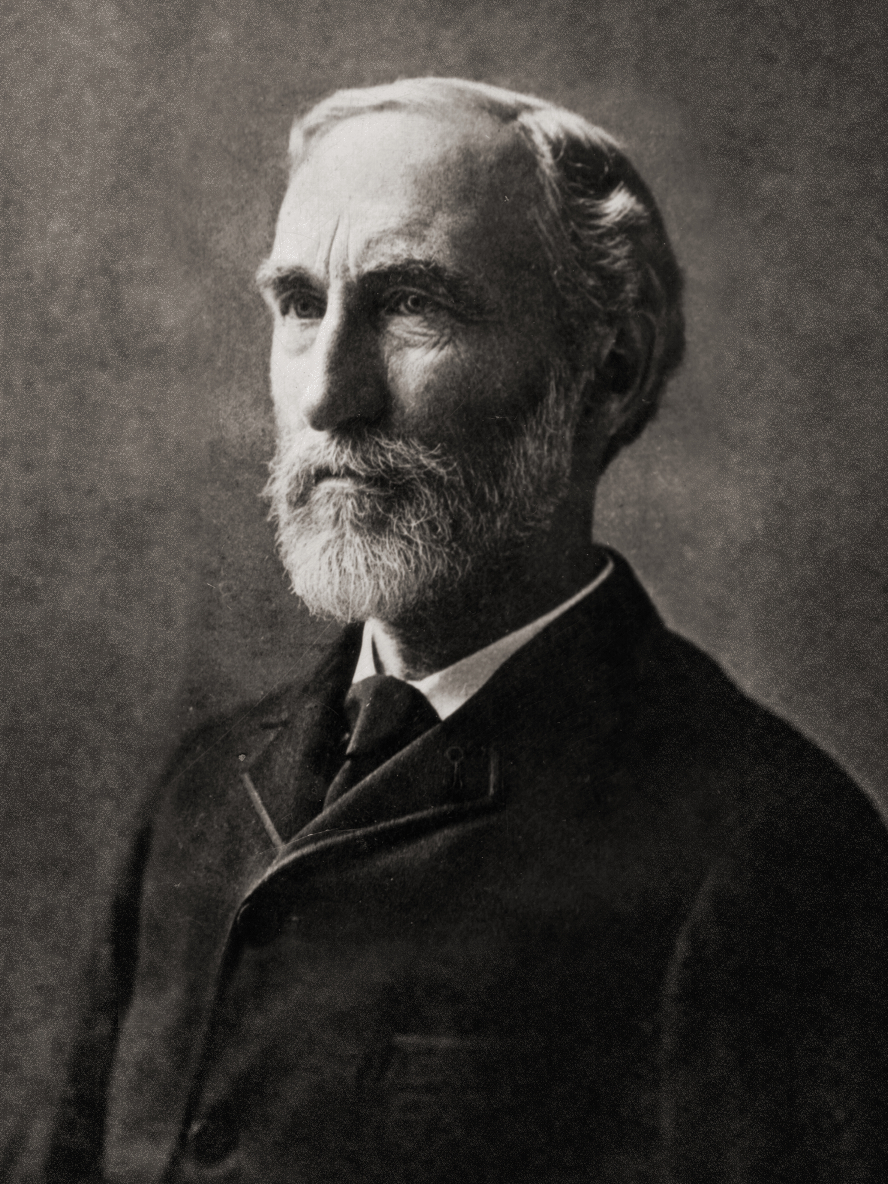
Josiah Willard Gibbs

In game theory and in particular the study of Blotto games and operational research, the Gibbs lemma is a result that is useful in maximization problems. It is named for Josiah Willard Gibbs.

Consider $\phi=\sum_{i=1}^n f_i(x_i)$. Suppose $\phi$ is maximized, subject to $\sum x_i=X$ and $x_i\geq 0$, at $x^0=(x_1^0,\ldots,x_n^0)$. If the $f_i$ are differentiable, then the Gibbs lemma states that there exists a $\lambda$ such that

$$\begin{align}
f'_i(x_i^0)&=\lambda \mbox{ if } x_i^0>0\\
&\leq\lambda\mbox { if }x_i^0=0.
\end{align}$$
