= Gibbs rotational ensemble =

Statistical ensemble

The Gibbs rotational ensemble represents the possible states of a mechanical system in thermal and rotational equilibrium at temperature $T$ and angular velocity $\boldsymbol\omega$. The Jaynes procedure can be used to obtain this ensemble. An ensemble is the set of microstates corresponding to a given macrostate.

The Gibbs rotational ensemble assigns a probability $p_i$ to a given microstate characterized by energy $E_i$ and angular momentum $\mathbf J_i$ for a given temperature $T$ and rotational velocity $\boldsymbol \omega$.

$$p_i = \frac{1}{Z} e^{-\beta (E_i - \boldsymbol\omega \cdot \mathbf J_i)}$$

where $Z$ is the partition function

$$Z = \sum_i e^{-\beta(E_i-\boldsymbol\omega\cdot\mathbf J_i)}$$

== Derivation ==
The Gibbs rotational ensemble can be derived using the same general method as to derive any ensemble, as given by E.T. Jaynes in his 1956 paper Information Theory and Statistical Mechanics. Let $f(x)$ be a function with expectation value

$$\langle f(x)\rangle = \sum_i p_i f(x_i)$$

where $p_i$ is the probability of $x_i$, which is not known a priori. The probabilities $p_i$ obey normalization

$$\sum_i p_i = 1$$

To find $p_i$, the Shannon entropy $H$ is maximized, where the Shannon entropy goes as

$$H \sim \sum_i p_i \ln(p_i)$$

The method of Lagrange multipliers is used to maximize $H$ under the constraints $\langle f(x)\rangle$ and the normalization condition, using Lagrange multipliers $\lambda$ and $\mu$ to find

$$p_i = e^{-\lambda-\mu f(x_i)}$$

$\lambda$ is found via normalization:

$$\lambda = \ln\left(\sum_i e^{-\mu f(x_i)}\right) = \ln(Z(\mu))$$

and $\langle f(x)\rangle$ can be written as

$$\langle f(x)\rangle = -\frac{\partial}{\partial \mu} \ln\left(\sum_i e^{-\mu f(x_i)}\right)=-\frac{\partial}{\partial \mu}\ln(Z(\mu))$$

where $Z$ is the partition function

$$Z(\mu) = \sum_i e^{-\mu f(x_i)}$$

This is easily generalized to any number of equations $f(x)$ via the incorporation of more Lagrange multipliers.

Now investigating the Gibbs rotational ensemble, the method of Lagrange multipliers is again used to maximize the Shannon entropy $H$, but this time under the constraints of energy expectation value $\langle E\rangle$ and angular momentum expectation value $\langle J\rangle$, which gives $p_i$ as

$$p_i = e^{-\lambda_0 E_i - \boldsymbol \lambda_1 \cdot \mathbf J_i - \lambda_3}$$

Via normalization, $\lambda_3$ is found to be

$$\lambda_3 = \ln\left(\sum_i e^{-\lambda_0 E_i-\boldsymbol \lambda_1 \cdot\mathbf J_i}\right) = \ln(Z)$$

Like before, $\langle E\rangle$ and $\langle J\rangle$ are given by

$$\langle E\rangle = -\frac{\partial}{\partial\lambda_0}\ln\left(\sum_i e^{-\lambda_0 E_i-\boldsymbol \lambda_1\cdot\mathbf J_i}\right)
= -\frac{\partial}{\partial\lambda_0} \ln\left(Z\right)$$

$$\langle J\rangle = -\frac{\partial}{\partial\lambda_1}\ln\left(\sum_i e^{-\lambda_0 E_i-\boldsymbol\lambda_1\cdot\mathbf J_i}\right)
= -\frac{\partial}{\partial\lambda_1} \ln(Z)$$

The entropy $S$ of the system is given by

$$S = -k\sum_i p_i\ln(p_i)=k(\lambda_0 \langle E\rangle +\boldsymbol\lambda_1\cdot\langle \mathbf{J} \rangle+\ln(Z))$$

such that

$$dS = k \left(\lambda_0 \mathrm{d}\langle E\rangle + \boldsymbol\lambda_1\mathrm{d}\langle \mathbf{J}\rangle + \mathrm{d}\ln(Z)\right)$$

where $k$ is the Boltzmann constant. The system is assumed to be in equilibrium, follow the laws of thermodynamics, and have fixed uniform temperature $T$ and angular velocity $\boldsymbol\omega$. The first law of thermodynamics as applied to this system is

$$\mathrm{d}E = \mathrm{d}Q+\boldsymbol\omega\cdot\mathrm{d}\langle \mathbf J\rangle$$

Recalling the entropy differential
$$\mathrm{d}S = \frac{\mathrm{d}Q}{T}$$

Combining the first law of thermodynamics with the entropy differential gives

$$\mathrm{d}S = \frac{\mathrm{d}E}{T}-\frac{\boldsymbol\omega\cdot\mathrm{d}\langle \mathbf J\rangle}{T}$$

Comparing this result with the entropy differential given by entropy maximization allows determination of $\lambda_0$ and $\boldsymbol\lambda_1$

$$\lambda_0 = \beta$$

$$\boldsymbol\lambda_1=-\beta \boldsymbol\omega$$

which allows the probability of a given state $p_i$ to be written as

$$p_i = \frac{1}{Z}e^{-\beta(E_i-\vec{\omega}\cdot\mathbf J_i)}$$

which is recognized as the probability of some microstate given a prescribed macrostate using the Gibbs rotational ensemble. The term $E_i-\boldsymbol\omega\cdot\mathbf J_i$ can be recognized as the effective Hamiltonian $\mathcal{H}$ for the system, which then simplifies the Gibbs rotational partition function to that of a normal canonical system

$$Z = \sum_i e^{-\beta\mathcal{H}_i}$$

== Applicability ==
The Gibbs rotational ensemble is useful for calculations regarding rotating systems. It is commonly used for describing particle distribution in centrifuges. For example, take a rotating cylinder (height $Z$, radius $R$) with fixed particle number $N$, fixed volume $V$, fixed average energy $\langle E\rangle$, and average angular momentum $\langle \mathbf J\rangle$. The expectation value of number density of particles $\langle n(r)\rangle$ at radius $r$ can be written as

$$\langle n(r)\rangle = \frac{1}{Z} \int n(r) \frac{\mathrm{d}^3 p\; \mathrm{d}^3q}{h^3}e^{-\beta(E-\boldsymbol{\omega}\cdot\mathbf J)}$$

Using the Gibbs rotational partition function, $Z$ can be calculated to be

$$Z=\frac{\pi ^{5/2} Z \sqrt{\beta m} \left(e^{\frac{1}{2} \beta m R^2 \omega ^2}-1\right)}{\sqrt{2} \beta ^3 h^3 \omega ^2}$$

Density of a particle at a given point can be thought of as unity divided by an infinitesimal volume, which can be represented as a delta function.

$$n(r) = \frac{1}{\mathrm{d}r\; r\;\mathrm{d}\theta \;\mathrm{d}z}\rightarrow\frac{\delta(r'-r)\delta(\theta'-\theta)\delta(z'-z)}{r'}$$

which finally gives $\langle n(r)\rangle$ as

$$\langle n(r)\rangle=\frac{\beta m \omega ^2}{2\pi Z}\frac{ e^{\frac{1}{2} \beta m r^2 \omega ^2}}{e^{\frac{1}{2} \beta m R^2 \omega ^2}-1}$$

which is the expected result.

== Difference between Grand canonical ensemble and Gibbs canonical ensemble ==
The Grand canonical ensemble and the Gibbs canonical ensemble are two different statistical ensembles used in statistical mechanics to describe systems with different constraints.

The grand canonical ensemble describes a system that can exchange both energy and particles with a reservoir. It is characterized by three variables: the temperature (T), chemical potential (μ), and volume (V) of the system. The chemical potential determines the average particle number in this ensemble, which allows for some variation in the number of particles. The grand canonical ensemble is commonly used to study systems with a fixed temperature and chemical potential, but a variable particle number, such as gases in contact with a particle reservoir.

On the other hand, the Gibbs canonical ensemble describes a system that can exchange energy but has a fixed number of particles. It is characterized by two variables: the temperature (T) and volume (V) of the system. In this ensemble, the energy of the system can fluctuate, but the number of particles remains fixed. The Gibbs canonical ensemble is commonly used to study systems with a fixed temperature and particle number, but variable energy, such as systems in thermal equilibrium.
