= Widom insertion method =

Method of calculating material and mixture properties in statistical thermodynamics

The Widom insertion method is a statistical thermodynamic approach to the calculation of material and mixture properties. It is named for Benjamin Widom, who derived it in 1963. In general, there are two theoretical approaches to determining the statistical mechanical properties of materials. The first is the direct calculation of the overall partition function of the system, which directly yields the system free energy. The second approach, known as the Widom insertion method, instead derives from calculations centering on one molecule. The Widom insertion method directly yields the chemical potential of one component rather than the system free energy. This approach is most widely applied in molecular computer simulations but has also been applied in the development of analytical statistical mechanical models. The Widom insertion method can be understood as an application of the Jarzynski equality since it measures the excess free energy difference via the average work needed to perform, when changing the system from a state with N molecules to a state with N+1 molecules. Therefore it measures the excess chemical potential since $\mu_\text{excess}={\Delta F_\text{excess}}/{\Delta N}$, where $\Delta N=1$.

== Overview ==
As originally formulated by Benjamin Widom in 1963, the approach can be summarized by the equation:

$$\mathbf{B}_i=\frac{\rho_i \lambda_i^3}{a_i}=\left \langle \exp \left ( -\frac{\psi_i}{k_B T} \right ) \right \rangle$$

where $\mathbf{B}_i$ is called the insertion parameter, $\rho_i$ is the number density of species $i$, $a_i = \exp(\mu_i/k_B T)$, where $\mu_i$ is the chemical potential, is the activity of species $i$, $\lambda_i$ is the Thermal de Broglie wavelength, $k_B$ is the Boltzmann constant, and $T$ is temperature, and $\psi$ is the interaction energy of an inserted particle with all other particles in the system. The average is over all possible insertions. This can be understood conceptually as fixing the location of all molecules in the system and then inserting a particle of species $i$ at all locations through the system, averaging over a Boltzmann factor in its interaction energy over all of those locations.

Note that in other ensembles like for example in the semi-grand canonical ensemble the Widom insertion method works with modified formulas.

== Relation to other thermodynamic quantities ==
=== Chemical potential ===
From the above equation and from the definition of activity, the insertion parameter may be related to the excess chemical potential by

$$\mu_i=-k_B T \ln \left (\frac{\mathbf{B}_i}{\rho_i \lambda_i^3}  \right )=\underbrace{k_B T \ln(\rho_i \lambda^3)}_{\mu_{id}} \underbrace{- k_B T \ln \left(\left \langle \exp \left ( -\frac{\psi_i}{k_B T} \right ) \right \rangle \right)}_{\mu_{ex}}=\mu_{id}+\mu_{ex}$$

=== Equation of state ===
The pressure-temperature-density relation, or equation of state of a mixture is related to the insertion parameter via

$$Z=\frac{P}{\rho k_B T}=1-\ln\mathbf{B}+\frac{1}{\rho}\int\limits_{0}^{\rho}\ln\mathbf{B}\,d\rho'$$

where $Z$ is the compressibility factor, $\rho$ is the overall number density of the mixture, and $\ln\mathbf{B}$ is a mole-fraction weighted average over all mixture components:

$$\ln\mathbf{B}=\sum_{i} {x_i \ln\mathbf{B}_i}$$

== Hard core model ==
In the case of a 'hard core' repulsive model in which each molecule or atom consists of a hard core with an infinite repulsive potential, insertions in which two molecules occupy the same space will not contribute to the average. In this case the insertion parameter becomes

$$\mathbf{B}_i=\mathbf{P}_{ins,i} \left \langle\exp \left ( -\frac{ \psi_i }{k_B T} \right)\right \rangle$$

where $\mathbf{P}_{ins,i}$ is the probability that the randomly inserted molecule of species $i$ will experience an attractive or zero net interaction; in other words, it is the probability that the inserted molecule does not 'overlap' with any other molecules.

== Mean field approximation ==
The above is simplified further via the application of the mean field approximation, which essentially ignores fluctuations and treats all quantities by their average value. Within this framework the insertion factor is given as

$$\mathbf{B}_i=\mathbf{P}_{ins,i} \exp \left ( -\frac{\left \langle \psi_i \right \rangle}{k_B T} \right )$$
