= KT (energy) =

Product of the Boltzmann constant and temperature

Approximate values of kT at 298 K
kT = 4.11×10^{−21} J
kT = 4.11 pN⋅nm
kT = 9.83×10^{−22} cal
kT = 25.7 meV
Related quantities (at 298 K)
kT/hc ≈ 207 cm^{−1}
kT/e = 25.7 mV
RT = 2.48 kJ⋅mol^{−1}
RT = 0.592 kcal⋅mol^{−1}
h/kT = 0.161 ps

kT (also written as k_{B}T) is the product of the Boltzmann constant, k (or k_{B}), and the temperature, T. This product is used in physics as a scale factor for energy values in molecular-scale systems (sometimes it is used as a unit of energy), as the rates and frequencies of many processes and phenomena depend not on their energy alone, but on the ratio of that energy and kT, that is, on E/kT (see Arrhenius equation and Boltzmann factor). For a system in equilibrium in canonical ensemble, the probability of the system being in state with energy E is proportional to $e^{\frac{-\Delta E}{kT}} .$

More fundamentally, kT is the amount of heat required to increase the thermodynamic entropy of a system by k.

In physical chemistry, as kT often appears in the denominator of fractions (usually because of Boltzmann distribution), sometimes β = 1/kT is used instead of kT, turning $e^{\frac{-\Delta E}{kT}}$ into e^{−βΔE}.

== RT ==
RT is the product of the molar gas constant, R, and the temperature, T. This product is used in physics and chemistry as a scaling factor for energy values in macroscopic scale (sometimes it is used as a pseudo-unit of energy), as many processes and phenomena depend not on the energy alone, but on the ratio of energy and RT, i.e. E/RT. The SI units for RT are joules per mole (J/mol).

It differs from kT only by a factor of the Avogadro constant, N_{A}. It is of dimension ML^{2}T^{−2}, expressed in SI units as joules (J):

kT = RT/N_{A}

== See also ==
- Thermal energy
