= LNE =

LNE may refer to:

- Laboratoire national de métrologie et d'essais, a French reference laboratory
- La Nouvelle École, international school in Rajasthan, India
- Lehigh and New England Railroad, a former American railroad
- La Nueva España, a newspaper published in Oviedo, Spain
- Lonorore Airport, IATA code LNE, on Pentecost Island, Vanuatu
- Limited nuclear exchange, a hypothesized, small-scale type of nuclear war
