= Ground state =

Lowest energy level of a quantum system

Energy levels for an electron in an atom: ground state and excited states. After absorbing energy, an electron may jump from the ground state to a higher-energy excited state.

The ground state of a quantum-mechanical system is its stationary state of lowest energy; the energy of the ground state is known as the zero-point energy of the system. An excited state is any state with energy greater than the ground state. In quantum field theory, the ground state is usually called the vacuum.

If more than one ground state exists, they are said to be degenerate. Many systems have degenerate ground states. Degeneracy occurs whenever there exists a unitary operator that acts non-trivially on a ground state and commutes with the Hamiltonian of the system.

According to the third law of thermodynamics, a system at absolute zero temperature exists in its ground state; thus, its entropy is determined by the degeneracy of the ground state. Many systems, such as a perfect crystal lattice, have a unique ground state and therefore have zero entropy at absolute zero. It is also possible for the highest excited state to have absolute zero temperature for systems that exhibit negative temperature.

== Absence of nodes in one dimension ==
In one dimension, the ground state of the Schrödinger equation can be proven to have no nodes.

=== Derivation ===
Consider the average energy of a state with a node at x = 0; i.e., ψ(0) = 0. The average energy in this state would be

$$\langle\psi|H|\psi\rangle = \int dx\, \left(-\frac{\hbar^2}{2m} \psi^* \frac{d^2\psi}{dx^2} + V(x)|\psi(x)|^2\right),$$

where V(x) is the potential.

With integration by parts:

$$\int_a^b \psi^* \frac{d^2\psi}{dx^2} dx
= \left[ \psi^*\frac{d\psi}{dx}\right]_a^b - \int_a^b \frac{d\psi^*}{dx}\frac{d\psi}{dx} dx
=  \left[ \psi^*\frac{d\psi}{dx}\right]_a^b - \int_a^b \left|\frac{d\psi}{dx}\right|^2 dx$$

Hence in case that $\left[ \psi^*\frac{d\psi}{dx}\right]_{-\infty}^{\infty} = \lim_{b\to\infty}\psi^*(b)\frac{d\psi}{dx}(b)-\lim_{a\to-\infty}\psi^*(a)\frac{d\psi}{dx}(a)$ is equal to zero, one gets:
$$-\frac{\hbar^2}{2m}\int_{-\infty}^{\infty} \psi^* \frac{d^2\psi}{dx^2} dx
= \frac{\hbar^2}{2m}\int_{-\infty}^{\infty} \left|\frac{d\psi}{dx}\right|^2 dx$$

Now, consider a small interval around $x = 0$; i.e., $x \in [-\varepsilon, \varepsilon]$. Take a new (deformed) wave function ψ'(x) to be defined as $\psi'(x) = \psi(x)$, for $x < -\varepsilon$; and $\psi'(x) = -\psi(x)$, for $x > \varepsilon$; and constant for $x \in [-\varepsilon, \varepsilon]$. If $\varepsilon$ is small enough, this is always possible to do, so that ψ'(x) is continuous.

Assuming $\psi(x) \approx -cx$ around $x = 0$, one may write
$$\psi'(x) = N \begin{cases}
|\psi(x)|,    & |x| >   \varepsilon, \\
c\varepsilon, & |x| \le \varepsilon,
\end{cases}$$
where $N = \frac{1}{\sqrt{1 + \frac{4}{3} |c|^2\varepsilon^3}}$ is the norm.

Note that the kinetic-energy densities hold $\frac{\hbar^2}{2m}\left|\frac{d\psi'}{dx}\right|^2 < \frac{\hbar^2}{2m}\left|\frac{d\psi}{dx}\right|^2$ everywhere because of the normalization. More significantly, the average kinetic energy is lowered by $O(\varepsilon)$ by the deformation to ψ'.

Now, consider the potential energy. For definiteness, let us choose $V(x) \ge 0$. Then it is clear that, outside the interval $x \in [-\varepsilon, \varepsilon]$, the potential energy density is smaller for the ψ' because $|\psi'| < |\psi|$ there.

On the other hand, in the interval $x \in [-\varepsilon, \varepsilon]$ we have
$${V^\varepsilon_\text{avg}}' = \int_{-\varepsilon}^\varepsilon dx\, V(x)|\psi'|^2 = \frac{\varepsilon^2|c|^2}{1 + \frac{4}{3}|c|^2\varepsilon^3} \int_{-\varepsilon}^\varepsilon dx\, V(x) \simeq 2\varepsilon^3|c|^2 V(0) + \cdots,$$
which holds to order $\varepsilon^3$.

However, the contribution to the potential energy from this region for the state ψ with a node is
$$V^\varepsilon_\text{avg} = \int_{-\varepsilon}^\varepsilon dx\, V(x)|\psi|^2 = |c|^2\int_{-\varepsilon}^\varepsilon dx\, x^2V(x) \simeq \frac{2}{3}\varepsilon^3|c|^2 V(0) + \cdots,$$
lower, but still of the same lower order $O(\varepsilon^3)$ as for the deformed state ψ', and subdominant to the lowering of the average kinetic energy. Therefore, the potential energy is unchanged up to order $\varepsilon^2$, if we deform the state $\psi$ with a node into a state ψ' without a node, and the change can be ignored.

We can therefore remove all nodes and reduce the energy by $O(\varepsilon)$, which implies that $\psi$ cannot be the ground state. Thus the ground-state wave function cannot have a node. This completes the proof. (The average energy may then be further lowered by eliminating undulations, to the variational absolute minimum.)

=== Implication ===
As the ground state has no nodes it is spatially non-degenerate, i.e. there are no two stationary quantum states with the energy eigenvalue of the ground state (let's name it $E_g$) and the same spin state and therefore would only differ in their position-space wave functions.

The reasoning goes by contradiction: For if the ground state would be degenerate then there would be two orthonormal stationary states $\left|\psi_1\right\rang$ and $\left|\psi_2\right\rang$ — later on represented by their complex-valued position-space wave functions $\psi_1(x,t)=\psi_1(x,0)\cdot e^{-iE_g t/\hbar}$ and $\psi_2(x,t)=\psi_2(x,0)\cdot e^{-iE_g t/\hbar}$ — and any superposition $\left|\psi_3\right\rang := c_1\left|\psi_1\right\rang + c_2\left|\psi_2\right\rang$ with the complex numbers $c_1, c_2$ fulfilling the condition $|c_1|^2+|c_2|^2=1$ would also be a be such a state, i.e. would have the same energy-eigenvalue $E_g$ and the same spin-state.

Now let $x_0$ be some random point (where both wave functions are defined) and set:
$$c_1=\frac{\psi_2(x_0,0)}{a}$$
and
$$c_2=\frac{-\psi_1(x_0,0)}{a}$$
with
$$a=\sqrt{|\psi_1(x_0,0)|^2+|\psi_2(x_0,0)|^2} > 0$$
(according to the premise no nodes).

Therefore, the position-space wave function of $\left|\psi_3\right\rang$ is
$$\psi_3(x,t)=c_1\psi_1(x,t)+c_2\psi_2(x,t) = \frac{1}{a}\left(\psi_2(x_0,0)\cdot\psi_1(x,0) - \psi_1(x_0,0)\cdot\psi_2(x,0) \right)\cdot e^{-iE_g t/\hbar}.$$

Hence
$$\psi_3(x_0,t)=\frac{1}{a}\left(\psi_2(x_0,0)\cdot\psi_1(x_0,0) - \psi_1(x_0,0)\cdot\psi_2(x_0,0) \right)\cdot e^{-iE_g t/\hbar} = 0$$
for all $t$.

But $\left\lang \psi_3|\psi_3\right\rang = |c_1|^2+|c_2|^2=1$ i.e., $x_0$ is a node of the ground state wave function and that is in contradiction to the premise that this wave function cannot have a node.

Note that the ground state could be degenerate because of different spin states like $\left|\uparrow\right\rang$ and $\left|\downarrow\right\rang$ while having the same position-space wave function: Any superposition of these states would create a mixed spin state but leave the spatial part (as a common factor of both) unaltered.

== Examples ==
Initial wave functions for the first four states of a one-dimensional particle in a box

- The wave function of the ground state of a particle in a one-dimensional box is a half-period sine wave, which goes to zero at the two edges of the well. The energy of the particle is given by $\frac{h^2 n^2}{8 m L^2}$, where h is the Planck constant, m is the mass of the particle, n is the energy state (n = 1 corresponds to the ground-state energy), and L is the width of the well.
- The wave function of the ground state of a hydrogen atom is a spherically symmetric distribution centred on the nucleus, which is largest at the center and reduces exponentially at larger distances. The electron is most likely to be found at a distance from the nucleus equal to the Bohr radius. This function is known as the 1s atomic orbital. For hydrogen (H), an electron in the ground state has energy −13.6 eV, relative to the ionization threshold. In other words, 13.6 eV is the energy input required for the electron to no longer be bound to the atom.
- The exact definition of one second of time since 1997 has been the duration of 9192631770 periods of the radiation corresponding to the transition between the two hyperfine levels of the ground state of the caesium-133 atom at rest at a temperature of 0 K.

== Bibliography ==
- Feynman, Richard; Leighton, Robert; Sands, Matthew (1965). "see section 2-5 for energy levels, 19 for the hydrogen atom". The Feynman Lectures on Physics. Vol. 3.
