= Kilocalorie per mole =

Unit for measuring energy

The kilocalorie per mole is a unit to measure an amount of energy per number of molecules, atoms, or other similar particles. It is defined as one kilocalorie of energy (1000 thermochemical gram calories) per one mole of substance. The unit symbol is written kcal/mol or kcal⋅mol^{−1}. As typically measured, one kcal/mol represents a temperature increase of one degree Celsius in one liter of water (with a mass of 1 kg) resulting from the reaction of one mole of reagents.

In SI units, one kilocalorie per mole is equal to 4.184 kilojoules per mole (kJ/mol), which comes to approximately 6.9477×10^{−21} joules per molecule, or about 0.043 eV per molecule. At room temperature (25 °C, 77 °F, or 298.15 K), one kilocalorie per mole is approximately equal to 1.688 kT per molecule.

Even though it is not an SI unit, the kilocalorie per mole is still widely used in chemistry and biology for thermodynamical quantities such as thermodynamic free energy, heat of vaporization, heat of fusion and ionization energy. This is due to a variety of factors, including the ease with which it can be calculated based on the units of measure typically employed in quantifying a chemical reaction, especially in aqueous solution. In addition, for many important biological processes, thermodynamic changes are on a convenient order of magnitude when expressed in kcal/mol. For example, for the reaction of glucose with ATP to form glucose-6-phosphate and ADP, the free energy of reaction is −4.0 kcal/mol using the pH = 7 standard state.
