= Établissement public à caractère industriel et commercial =

Type of corporation in France and former colonies, usually state-owned

An établissement public à caractère industriel et commercial (French pronunciation: [etablismɑ̃ pyblik a kaʁaktɛʁ ɛ̃dystʁijɛl e kɔmɛʁsjal], EPIC; lit. 'public institution of an industrial and commercial nature') is, in France, a category of public undertaking. It includes state-controlled entities of an industrial or commercial nature, including some research institutes and infrastructure operators. Some former French colonies, such as Algeria, Burkina Faso and Mauritania also use this term for such agencies.

EPICs were first recognized as a specific form of public agencies by the Court of Arbitration's (French: Tribunal des conflits) case law in 1921. In accordance with Article 34 of the French Constitution, they can only be created by a law. Not every company whose capital is held by the state or a state-owned entity is an EPIC. An EPIC is under special laws which do not apply to enterprises under private company law, even if the capital of those companies is held by the state.

== List of EPICs ==
=== Current ===
- Agence nationale pour la gestion des déchets radioactifs (Andra)
- Airport Basel-Mulhouse
- Commissariat à l'énergie atomique (CEA), the energy research agency
- CNES, the French government space agency
- BRGM, the French geological survey
- Centre Scientifique et Technique du Batiment (CSTB), the scientific and technical centre for building
- Ifremer, "Institut français de recherche pour l'exploitation de la mer", an oceanographic institute
- Institut de radioprotection et de sûreté nucléaire, (IRSN) the French institute for radioprotection and nuclear safety
- Laboratoire national de métrologie et d'essais, a standards laboratory
- Monnaie de Paris, the French mint authority
- ONF, the national forestry service
- ONERA, the aerospace laboratory
- CIRAD, Centre de coopération internationale en recherche agronomique pour le développement, Agricultural Development Centre
- Opéra national de Paris
- Régie Autonome des Transports Parisiens (RATP), the operator of the Paris Métro and other public transport in Paris
- Réseau ferré de France (RFF), the national railway infrastructure company
- Réseau Ferré National (RFN).
- Voies navigables de France (VNF), the inland waterways authority
- ENSCI-Les Ateliers, an industrial design school

=== Former EPICs ===
Former public service operations which have been turned into companies governed by private law include:

- Aéroports de Paris (ADP)
- EDF, the national electricity company
- GDF, the national gas company
- Seita, the former tobacco monopoly
- Société nationale des chemins de fer français, the national railway network (name remains the same with no "S.A." suffix added)

== Legal basis in external documents from Legifrance ==
- Dispositions générales applicables aux établissements du secteur public
- Régime comptable des établissements publics à caractère industriel et commercial
