= Thermodynamic beta =

Measure of the coldness of a system

SI temperature/coldness conversion scale: Temperatures in Kelvin scale are shown in blue (Celsius scale in green, Fahrenheit scale in red), coldness values in gigabyte per nanojoule are shown in black. Infinite temperature (coldness zero) is shown at the top of the diagram; positive values of coldness/temperature are on the right-hand side, negative values on the left-hand side.

In statistical thermodynamics, thermodynamic beta, also known as coldness, is the reciprocal of the thermodynamic temperature of a system:
$$\beta \equiv \frac{1}{k_{\rm B}T}$$
(where T is the temperature and k_{B} is Boltzmann constant).

Thermodynamic beta has units reciprocal to that of energy (in SI units, reciprocal joules, $[\beta] = \textrm{J}^{-1}$). In non-thermal units, it can also be measured in byte per joule, or more conveniently, gigabyte per nanojoule; 1 K^{−1} is equivalent to about 13,062 gigabytes per nanojoule; at room temperature: T = 300K, β ≈ 44 GB/nJ ≈ 39 eV^{−1} ≈ 2.4×10^{20} J^{−1}. The conversion factor is 1 GB/nJ = $8\ln2\times 10^{18}$ J^{−1}.

== Description ==
Thermodynamic beta is essentially the connection between the information theory and statistical mechanics interpretation of a physical system through its entropy and the thermodynamics associated with its energy. It expresses the response of entropy to an increase in energy. If a small amount of energy is added to the system, then β describes the amount the system will randomize.

Via the statistical definition of temperature as a function of entropy, the coldness function can be calculated in the microcanonical ensemble from the formula

$$\beta = \frac1{k_{\rm B} T} \,  =\frac{1}{k_{\rm B}}\left(\frac{\partial S}{\partial E}\right)_{V, N}$$

(i.e., the partial derivative of the entropy S with respect to the energy E at constant volume V and particle number N).

=== Advantages ===
Although completely equivalent in conceptual content to temperature, β is generally considered a more fundamental quantity than temperature owing to the phenomenon of negative temperature, in which β is continuous as it crosses zero whereas T has a singularity.

In addition, β has the advantage of being easier to understand causally: If a small amount of heat is added to a system, β is the increase in entropy divided by the increase in heat. Temperature is difficult to interpret in the same sense, as it is not possible to "Add entropy" to a system except indirectly, by modifying other quantities such as temperature, volume, or number of particles.

== Statistical interpretation ==
From the statistical point of view, β is a numerical quantity relating two macroscopic systems in equilibrium. The exact formulation is as follows. Consider two systems, 1 and 2, in thermal contact, with respective energies E_{1} and E_{2}. We assume E_{1} + E_{2} = some constant E. The number of microstates of each system will be denoted by Ω_{1} and Ω_{2}. Under our assumptions Ω_{i} depends only on E_{i}. We also assume that any microstate of system 1 consistent with E_{1} can coexist with any microstate of system 2 consistent with E_{2}. Thus, the number of microstates for the combined system is

$$\Omega = \Omega_1 (E_1) \Omega_2 (E_2) = \Omega_1 (E_1) \Omega_2 (E-E_1)  . \,$$

We will derive β from the fundamental assumption of statistical mechanics:

When the combined system reaches equilibrium, the number Ω is maximized.

(In other words, the system naturally seeks the maximum number of microstates.) Therefore, at equilibrium,

$$\frac{d}{d E_1} \Omega = \Omega_2 (E_2)  \frac{d}{d E_1} \Omega_1 (E_1) + \Omega_1 (E_1) \frac{d}{d E_2} \Omega_2 (E_2) \cdot \frac{d E_2}{d E_1} = 0.$$

But E_{1} + E_{2} = E implies

$$\frac{d E_2}{d E_1} = -1.$$

So

$$\Omega_2 (E_2)  \frac{d}{d E_1} \Omega_1 (E_1) - \Omega_1 (E_1) \frac{d}{d E_2} \Omega_2 (E_2) = 0$$

i.e.

$$\frac{d}{d E_1} \ln \Omega_1 = \frac{d}{d E_2} \ln \Omega_2 \quad \mbox{at equilibrium.}$$

The above relation motivates a definition of β:

$$\beta =\frac{d \ln \Omega}{ d E}.$$

== Connection of statistical view with thermodynamic view ==
When two systems are in equilibrium, they have the same thermodynamic temperature T. Thus intuitively, one would expect β (as defined via microstates) to be related to T in some way. This link is provided by Boltzmann's fundamental assumption written as

$$S = k_{\rm B} \ln \Omega,$$

where k_{B} is the Boltzmann constant, S is the classical thermodynamic entropy, and Ω is the number of microstates. So

$$d \ln \Omega = \frac{1}{k_{\rm B}} d S .$$

Substituting into the definition of β from the statistical definition above gives

$$\beta = \frac{1}{k_{\rm B}} \frac{d S}{d E}.$$

Comparing with thermodynamic formula

$$\frac{d S}{d E} = \frac{1}{T} ,$$

we have

$$\beta = \frac{1}{k_{\rm B} T} = \frac{1}{\tau}$$

where $\tau$ is called the fundamental temperature of the system, and has units of energy.

== History ==
The thermodynamic beta was originally introduced in 1971 (as Kältefunktion "coldness function") by Ingo Müller, one of the proponents of the rational thermodynamics school of thought, based on earlier proposals for a "reciprocal temperature" function.

== See also ==
- Boltzmann distribution
- Canonical ensemble
- Ising model
