= Joule per mole =

SI derived unit of molar energy

joule per mole
- Unit system: SI
- Unit of: molar energy
- Symbol: J/mol

Conversions
1 J/mol in ...	... is equal to ...
- SI base units: kg⋅m^{2}⋅s^{−2}⋅mol^{−1}

The joule per mole (symbol: J·mol^{−1} or J/mol) is the unit of molar energy, which is the ratio of energy to amount of substance in the International System of Units (SI).

The energy concerned may be thermodynamic energy, enthalpy, etc. For example, the Gibbs free energy of a compound in the area of thermochemistry is often quantified with the unit kilojoule per mole (symbol: kJ·mol^{−1} or kJ/mol).

Physical quantities measured in J·mol^{−1} usually describe quantities of energy transferred during phase transitions or chemical reactions. Division by the number of moles facilitates comparison between processes involving different quantities of material and between similar processes involving different types of materials. The precise meaning of such a quantity is dependent on the context (what substances are involved, circumstances, etc.), but the unit of measurement is used specifically to describe certain existing phenomena, such as in thermodynamics it is the unit of measurement that describes molar energy.

Since there are 6.02214076×10^{23} particles (atoms, molecules, ions etc.) per mole, 1 joule per mole is equal to 1 joule multiplied by 6.02214076×10^{23} particles. Because of the typical order of magnitude for energy changes in chemical processes, kJ·mol^{−1} is normally used instead of J·mol^{−1}. For example, heats of fusion and vaporization are usually of the order of 10 kJ·mol^{−1}, bond energies are of the order of 100 kJ·mol^{−1}, and ionization energies of the order of 1000 kJ·mol^{−1}. For this reason, it is common within the field of chemistry to quantify the enthalpy of reaction with the unit kJ·mol^{−1}.

Other units sometimes used to describe reaction energetics are the kilocalorie per mole (kcal·mol^{−1}), electronvolt per particle (eV), and wavenumbers in inverse centimeters (cm^{−1}). 1 kJ·mol^{−1} is approximately equal to 1.04×10^{−2} eV per particle, 0.239 kcal·mol^{−1}, or 83.6 cm^{−1}. At room temperature (25 °C, or 298.15 K) 1 kJ·mol^{−1} is approximately equal to 0.403 k_{B}T.
