= Laboratoire national de métrologie et d'essais =

French reference laboratory

The French Laboratoire national de métrologie et d'essais (National Laboratory of Metrology and Testing) is a reference laboratory responsible for carrying out measurement and testing products of all kinds for their certification for placing them on the market. It also coordinates metrology activities in France. It was previously known as the Laboratoire national d'essais (LNE), and still uses those initials.

Originally established in 1901, it is now a state-owned enterprise, and operates as an établissement public à caractère industriel et commercial, a French type of state-controlled entity of an industrial or commercial nature.

Its headquarters is located in the 15th arrondissement of Paris.

== Early history ==
When the Metre Convention was signed in Paris in 1875, it was at the National Conservatory of Arts and Crafts (CNAM) that the main verifications of weights and measures attributed to foreign governments were carried out, as they adopt the metric system. Nevertheless, the increased needs for measurements, both for mechanics and physics and for industry, testify to the need to have a laboratory for measurements and tests. From then on, it was under the aegis of the Society of Civil Engineers of France that the Experimentation and Testing Service gradually developed and finally obtained official recognition with the signing, in 1901, of an agreement between the Ministry of Commerce and the Paris Chamber of Commerce.

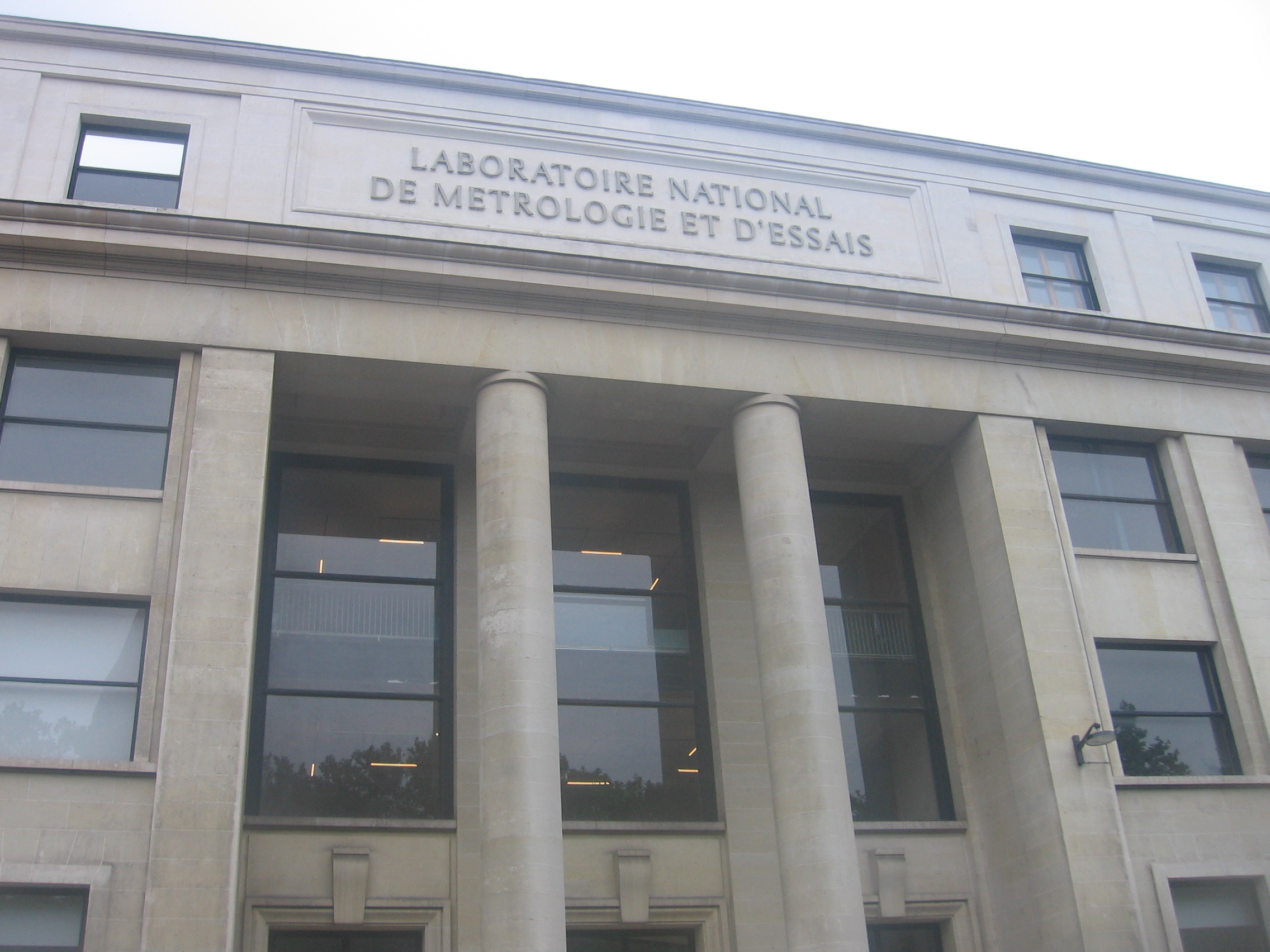
Laboratoire national de métrologie et d'essais

Thus, on July 9, 1901, the Mechanical, Physical, Chemical and Machinery Testing Laboratory was created. This laboratory was established within the National Conservatory of Arts and Crafts symbolizing the union of science and industry. It was governed by the law of July 9, 1901, and inaugurated on July 1, 1903, by the President of the Republic in premises located on the Rue Saint-Martin.

At its beginnings, the Laboratory moved into different buildings of the CNAM and its activities were divided into five sections: physical tests, metal tests, building materials tests, machine tests and "research and tests on new plant raw materials or insufficiently known.

One of its first vocations was also reaffirmed by a decree of August 11, 1936, which attached to it the deposit of national standards of the metric system, it would also participate in the establishment of the thermometric scale, the specifications of which had been enacted at the 1927 General Conference on Weights and Measures.

In 1955, the test laboratory moved into a new building which became its new head office, rue Gaston-Boissier, in the 15th arrondissement of Paris. The construction of the building began in 1942 but was interrupted during the Second World War before resuming in 1946. The building was finally completed in 1962.
