= Boltzmann constant =

Physical constant relating particle kinetic energy with temperature

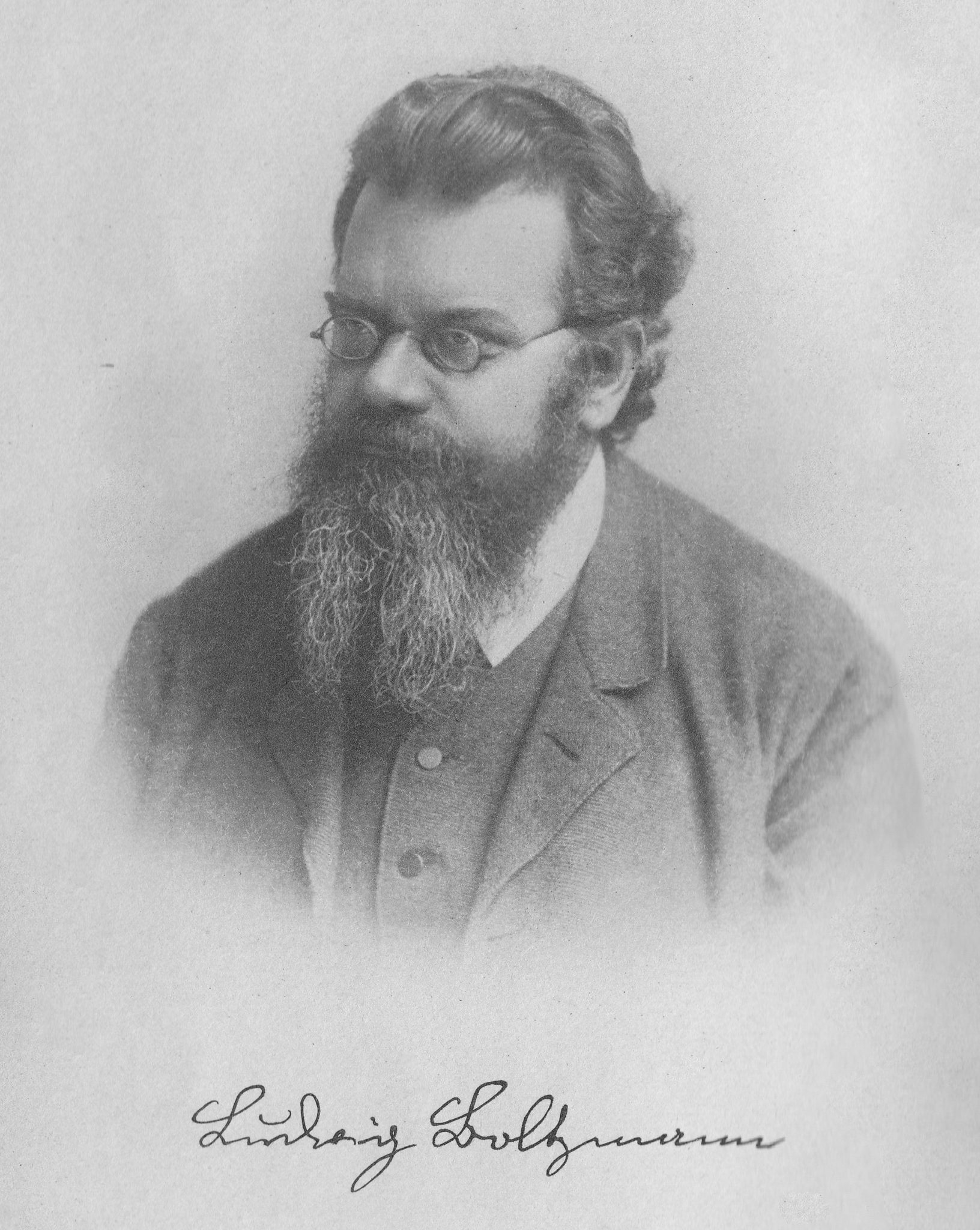
- Ludwig Boltzmann, the constant's namesake

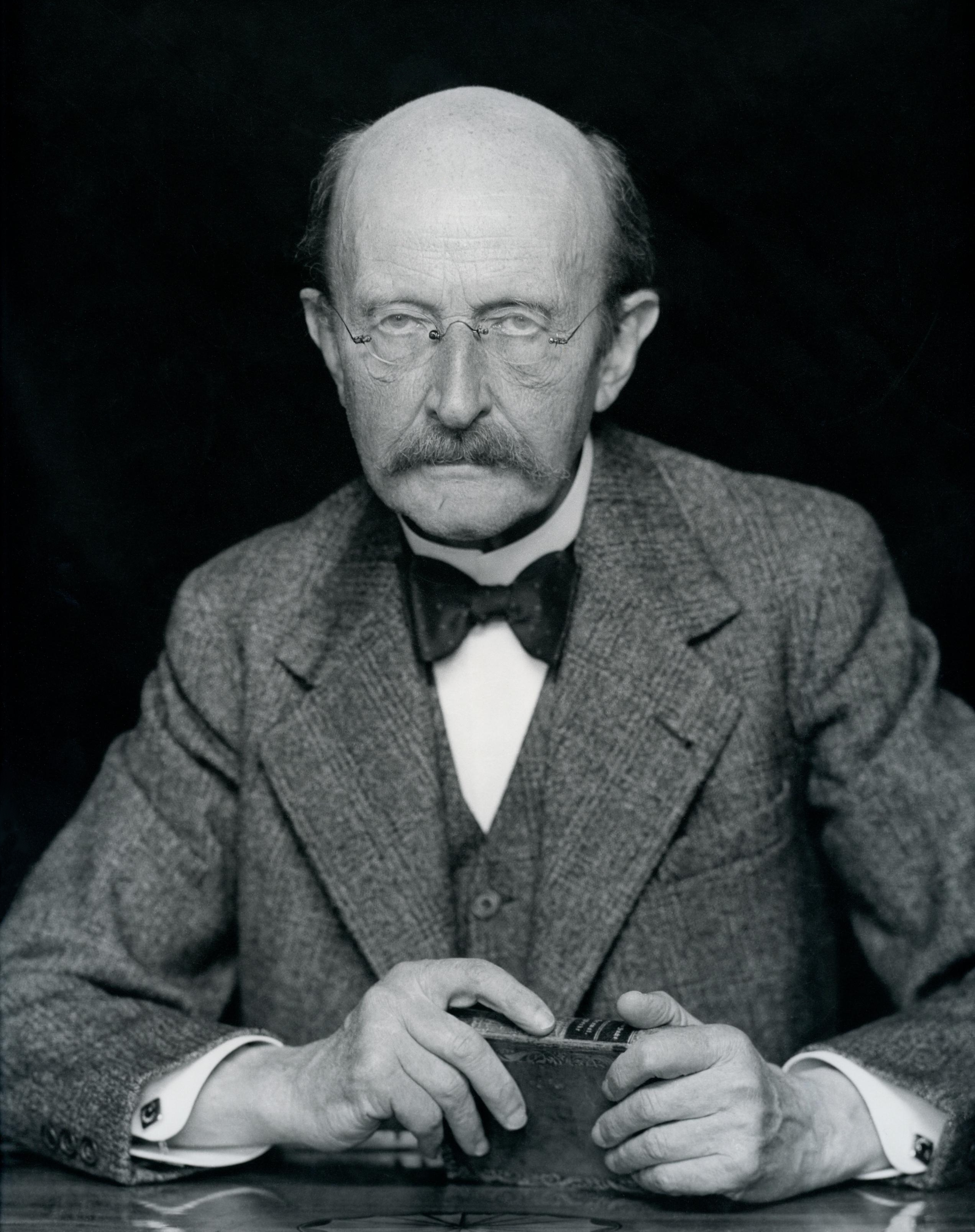
- Max Planck, who discovered and named the constant
- Symbol: k_{B}, k
- Value in joules per kelvin: 1.380649×10^{−23} J⋅K^{−1}
- Value in electronvolts per kelvin: 8.617333262×10^{−5} eV⋅K^{−1}

The Boltzmann constant (k_{B} or k) is the proportionality factor that relates the average relative thermal energy of particles in a gas with the thermodynamic temperature of the gas. It occurs in the definitions of the kelvin (K) and the molar gas constant, in Planck's law of black-body radiation and Boltzmann's entropy formula, and is used in calculating thermal noise in resistors. The Boltzmann constant has dimensions of energy divided by temperature, the same as entropy and heat capacity. It is named after the Austrian scientist Ludwig Boltzmann.

As part of the 2019 revision of the SI, the Boltzmann constant is one of the seven "defining constants" that have been defined so as to have exact finite decimal values in SI units. They are used in various combinations to define the seven SI base units. The Boltzmann constant is defined to be exactly 1.380649×10^{−23} joules per kelvin, with the effect of defining the SI unit kelvin.

== Roles of the Boltzmann constant ==
Relationships between Boyle's, Charles's, Gay-Lussac's, Avogadro's, combined and ideal gas laws, with the Boltzmann constant k = R/N_{A} = (n R)/N (in each law, properties circled are variable and properties not circled are held constant)

IUPAC definition

Boltzmann constant: The Boltzmann constant, k, is one of seven fixed constants defining the International System of Units, the SI, with k = 1.380649×10^{−23} J K^{−1}. The Boltzmann constant is a proportionality constant between the quantities temperature (with unit kelvin) and energy (with unit joule).

Macroscopically, the ideal gas law states that, for an ideal gas, the product of pressure p and volume V is proportional to the product of amount of substance n and absolute temperature T:
$$pV = nRT ,$$
where R is the molar gas constant (8.31446261815324 J⋅K^{−1}⋅mol^{−1}). Introducing the Boltzmann constant as the gas constant per molecule k = R/N_{A} (N_{A} being the Avogadro constant) transforms the ideal gas law into an alternative form:
$$p V = N k T ,$$
where N is the number of molecules of gas.

=== Role in the equipartition of energy ===
Given a thermodynamic system at an absolute temperature T, the average thermal energy carried by each microscopic degree of freedom in the system is 1/2 kT (i.e., about 2.07×10^{−21} J, or 0.013 eV, at room temperature). This is generally true only for classical systems with a large number of particles.

In classical statistical mechanics, this average is predicted to hold exactly for homogeneous ideal gases. Monatomic ideal gases (the six noble gases) possess three degrees of freedom per atom, corresponding to the three spatial directions. According to the equipartition of energy this means that there is a thermal energy of 3/2 kT per atom. This corresponds very well with experimental data. The thermal energy can be used to calculate the root-mean-square speed of the atoms, which turns out to be inversely proportional to the square root of the atomic mass. The root mean square speeds found at room temperature accurately reflect this, ranging from 1370 m/s for helium, down to 240 m/s for xenon.

Kinetic theory gives the average pressure p for an ideal gas as
$$p = \frac{1}{3}\frac{N}{V} m \overline{v^2}.$$

Combination with the ideal gas law
$$p V = N k T$$
shows that the average translational kinetic energy is
$$\tfrac{1}{2}m \overline{v^2} = \tfrac{3}{2} k T.$$

Considering that the translational motion velocity vector v has three degrees of freedom (one for each dimension) gives the average energy per degree of freedom equal to one third of that, i.e. 1/2 kT.

The ideal gas equation is also obeyed closely by molecular gases; but the form for the heat capacity is more complicated, because the molecules possess additional internal degrees of freedom, as well as the three degrees of freedom for movement of the molecule as a whole. Diatomic gases, for example, possess a total of six degrees of simple freedom per molecule that are related to atomic motion (three translational, two rotational, and one vibrational). At lower temperatures, not all these degrees of freedom may fully participate in the gas heat capacity, due to quantum mechanical limits on the availability of excited states at the relevant thermal energy per molecule.

=== Role in Boltzmann factors ===
More generally, systems in equilibrium at temperature T have probability P_{i} of occupying a state i with energy E weighted by the corresponding Boltzmann factor:
$$P_i \propto \frac{\exp\left(-\frac{E}{k T}\right)}{Z},$$
where Z is the partition function. Again, it is the energy-like quantity kT that takes central importance.

Consequences of this include (in addition to the results for ideal gases above) the Arrhenius equation in chemical kinetics.

=== Role in the statistical definition of entropy ===
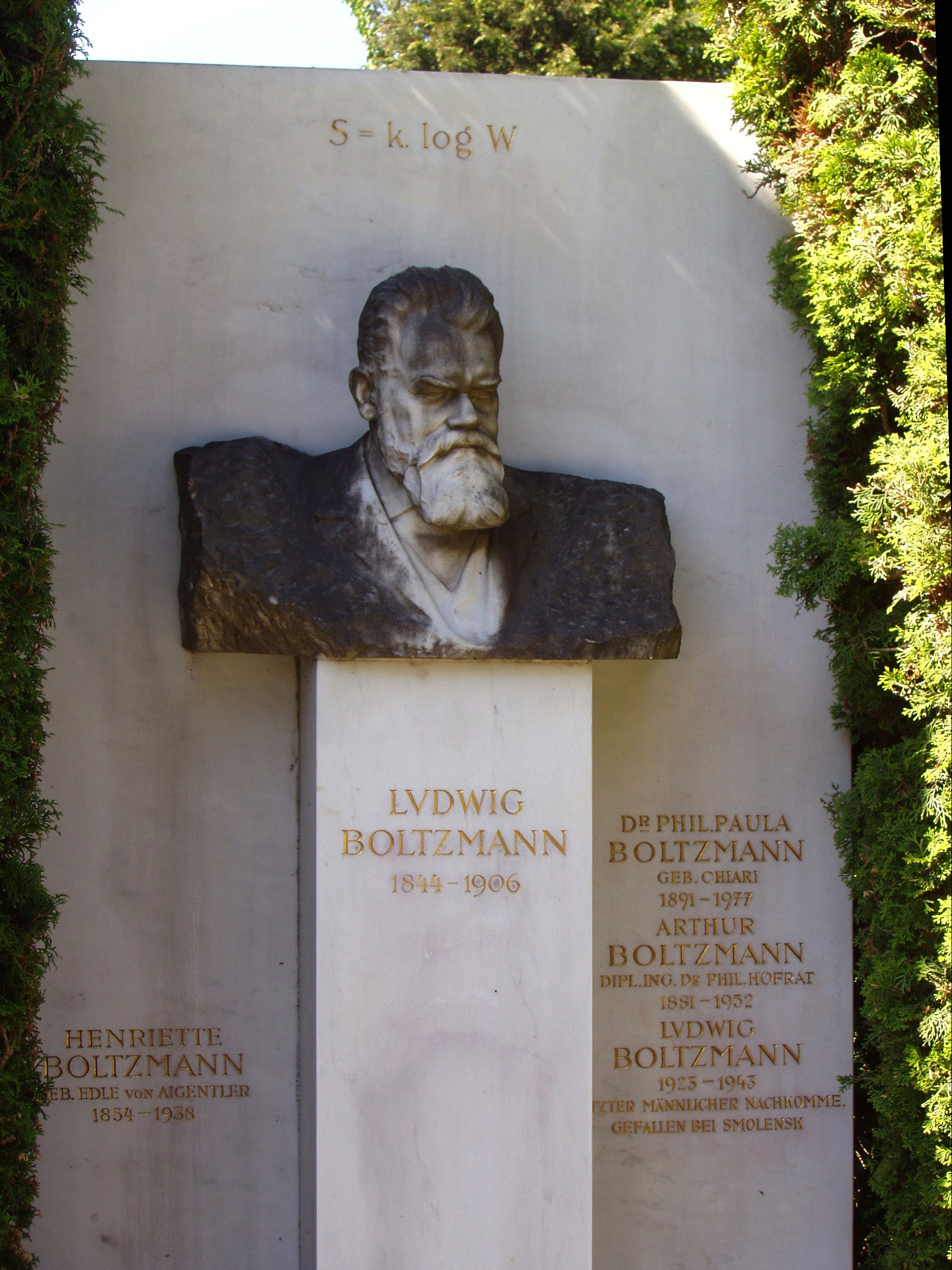
Boltzmann's grave in the Zentralfriedhof, Vienna, with bust and entropy formula.

In statistical mechanics, the entropy S of an isolated system at thermodynamic equilibrium is defined as the natural logarithm of W, the number of distinct microscopic states available to the system given the macroscopic constraints (such as a fixed total energy E):
$$S = k \,\ln W.$$

This equation, which relates the microscopic details, or microstates, of the system (via W) to its macroscopic state (via the entropy S), is the central idea of statistical mechanics. Such is its importance that it is inscribed on Boltzmann's tombstone.

The constant of proportionality k serves to make the statistical mechanical entropy equal to the classical thermodynamic entropy of Clausius:
$$\Delta S = \int \frac{{\rm d}Q}{T}.$$

One could choose instead a rescaled dimensionless entropy in microscopic terms such that
$${S' = \ln W}, \quad \Delta S' = \int \frac{\mathrm{d}Q}{k T}.$$

This is a more natural form and this rescaled entropy corresponds exactly to Shannon's information entropy.

The characteristic energy kT is thus the energy required to increase the rescaled entropy by one nat.

=== Thermal voltage ===
In semiconductors, the Shockley diode equation—the relationship between the flow of electric current and the electrostatic potential across a p–n junction—depends on a characteristic voltage called the thermal voltage, denoted by V_{T}. The thermal voltage depends on absolute temperature T as
$$V_\mathrm{T}  =  { k T \over q } = { R T \over F },$$
where q is the magnitude of the electrical charge on the electron with a value 1.602176634×10^{−19} C. Equivalently,
$${ V_\mathrm{T} \over T } = { k \over q } \approx 8.617333262 \times 10^{-5}\ \mathrm{V/K}.$$

At room temperature 300 K (27 °C; 80 °F), V_{T} is approximately 25.85 mV, which can be derived by plugging in the values as follows:
$$V_\mathrm{T}={kT \over q}
=\frac{1.38\times 10^{-23}\ \mathrm{J{\cdot}K^{-1}} \times 300\ \mathrm{K}}{1.6 \times 10^{-19}\ \mathrm{C}}
\simeq 25.85\ \mathrm{mV}$$

At the standard state temperature of 298.15 K (25.00 °C; 77.00 °F), it is approximately 25.69 mV. The thermal voltage is also important in plasmas and electrolyte solutions (e.g. the Nernst equation); in both cases it provides a measure of how much the spatial distribution of electrons or ions is affected by a boundary held at a fixed voltage.

== History ==
The Boltzmann constant is named after its 19th century Austrian discoverer, Ludwig Boltzmann. Although Boltzmann first linked entropy and probability in 1877, the relation was never expressed with a specific constant until Max Planck first introduced k, and gave a more precise value for it (1.346×10^{−23} J/K, about 2.5% lower than today's figure), in his derivation of the law of black-body radiation in 1900–1901. Before 1900, equations involving Boltzmann factors were not written using the energies per molecule and the Boltzmann constant, but rather using a form of the gas constant R, and macroscopic energies for macroscopic quantities of the substance. The iconic terse form of the equation S = k ln W on Boltzmann's tombstone is in fact due to Planck, not Boltzmann. Planck actually introduced it in the same work as his eponymous h.

In 1920, Planck wrote in his Nobel Prize lecture:

This constant is often referred to as Boltzmann's constant, although, to my knowledge, Boltzmann himself never introduced it—a peculiar state of affairs, which can be explained by the fact that Boltzmann, as appears from his occasional utterances, never gave thought to the possibility of carrying out an exact measurement of the constant.

This "peculiar state of affairs" is illustrated by reference to one of the great scientific debates of the time. There was considerable disagreement in the second half of the nineteenth century as to whether atoms and molecules were real or whether they were simply a heuristic tool for solving problems. There was no agreement whether chemical molecules, as measured by atomic weights, were the same as physical molecules, as measured by kinetic theory. Planck's 1920 lecture continued:

Nothing can better illustrate the positive and hectic pace of progress which the art of experimenters has made over the past twenty years, than the fact that since that time, not only one, but a great number of methods have been discovered for measuring the mass of a molecule with practically the same accuracy as that attained for a planet.

In versions of SI prior to the 2019 revision of the SI, the Boltzmann constant was a measured quantity rather than having a fixed numerical value. Its exact definition also varied over the years due to redefinitions of the kelvin (see Kelvin § History) and other SI base units (see Joule § History).

In 2017, the most accurate measures of the Boltzmann constant were obtained by acoustic gas thermometry, which determines the speed of sound of a monatomic gas in a triaxial ellipsoid chamber using microwave and acoustic resonances. This decade-long effort was undertaken with different techniques by several laboratories; (Note: Independent techniques exploited: acoustic gas thermometry, dielectric constant gas thermometry, Johnson noise thermometry. Involved laboratories cited by CODATA in 2017: LNE-Cnam (France), NPL (UK), INRIM (Italy), PTB (Germany), NIST (USA), NIM (China).) it is one of the cornerstones of the revision of the SI. Based on these measurements, the value of 1.380649×10^{−23} J/K was recommended as the final fixed value of the Boltzmann constant to be used for the 2019 revision of the SI.

As a precondition for redefining the Boltzmann constant, there must be one experimental value with a relative uncertainty below 1 ppm, and at least one measurement from a second technique with a relative uncertainty below 3 ppm. The acoustic gas thermometry reached 0.2 ppm, and Johnson noise thermometry reached 2.8 ppm.

== Value in different units ==
Values of k	Comments
1.380649×10^{−23} J⋅K^{−1}	SI definition
8.617333262...×10^{−5} eV/K	
2.083661912...×10^{10} Hz/K	(k/h)
1.380649×10^{−16} erg/K	CGS, 1 erg = 10^{−7} J
3.297623483...×10^{−24} cal/K	1 calorie = 4.1868 J
1.832013046...×10^{−24} cal/°R	
5.657302466...×10^{−24} ft lb/°R	
0.695034800... cm^{−1}/K	(k/(hc))
3.166811563×10^{−6} E_{h}/K	atomic units
1.987204259...×10^{−3} kcal/(mol⋅K)	(kN_{A})
8.314462618...×10^{−3} kJ/(mol⋅K)	(kN_{A})
−228.5991672... dB(W/K/Hz)	10 log_{10}(k/(W/K/Hz)), used for thermal noise calculations
1.536179187...×10^{−40} kg/K	(k/c^{2})

Since k is a proportionality constant between temperature and energy, its numerical value depends on the choice of units for energy and temperature. The small numerical value of the Boltzmann constant in SI units means a change in temperature by 1 K changes a particle's energy by only a small amount. A change of 1 °C is defined to be the same as a change of 1 K. The characteristic energy kT is a term encountered in many physical relationships.

The Boltzmann constant sets up a relationship between wavelength and temperature (dividing hc/k by a wavelength gives a temperature) with 1000 nm being related to 14387.777 K, and also a relationship between voltage and temperature, with one volt corresponding to 11604.518 K.

=== Natural units ===
The Boltzmann constant provides a mapping from the characteristic microscopic energy E to the macroscopic temperature scale T = E/k. In fundamental physics, this mapping is often simplified by using the natural units of setting k to unity. This convention means that temperature and energy quantities have the same dimensions. In particular, the SI unit kelvin becomes superfluous, being defined in terms of joules as 1 K = 1.380649×10^{−23} J. With this convention, temperature is always given in units of energy, and the Boltzmann constant is not explicitly needed in formulas.

This convention simplifies many physical relationships and formulas. For example, the equipartition formula for the energy associated with each classical degree of freedom becomes
$$E_{\mathrm{dof}} = \tfrac{1}{2} T$$

As another example, the definition of thermodynamic entropy coincides with the form of information entropy:
$$S = - \sum_i P_i \ln P_i.$$
where P_{i} is the probability of each microstate. If it is assumed that each microstate is equally likely and W is the number of microstates, then Boltzmann's entropy formula becomes
$$S = \ln W$$

== See also ==
- Committee on Data of the International Science Council
- Thermodynamic beta
- List of scientists whose names are used in physical constants
