= Kubo =

Kubo or KUBO may refer to:

- Kubo (surname)
- Kubo gap, the average spacing between consecutive energy levels
- Kubo language, a Trans–New Guinea language of New Guinea
- Kantō kubō, the ruler of the Kantō region during the early Muromachi period in Japan
- Lit Kubo, a proposed electric cargo scooter
- KUBO, a radio station in Calexico, California, U.S.
- Kubo formula, an equation in quantum mechanics

== See also ==
- Suō-Kubo Station, on the Gantoku Line in Kudamatsu, Yamaguchi, Japan
- Bahay Kubo: A Pinoy Mano Po!, a Tagalog-language movie
- Green–Kubo relations, a mathematical expression, named for Ryogo Kubo
- Kubo and the Two Strings, a 2016 stop-motion animated film from Laika Entertainment
- Kubo Won't Let Me Be Invisible, a 2019 manga and 2023 anime
- Cuba, known as Kubo in Esperanto
