= Frenesy (physics) =

Concept in physics

In statistical physics, frenesy is a measure of the dynamical activity of a system's microscopic trajectories under non-equilibrium conditions. Frenesy complements the notion of entropy production (which measures time-antisymmetric aspects associated with irreversibility), and represents how frequently states are visited or how many transitions occur over time, as well as how busy the system's trajectories are. It relates to reactivities, escape rates, and residence times of a physical state, as it quantifies the rate of microscopic configuration changes that accompany entropy production in nonequilibrium steady states.

== Origin and context ==
The concept of frenesy was introduced in 2006 in the study of non-equilibrium processes. In systems described by trajectory ensembles or path-space measures (e.g. arising from Markov processes or Langevin dynamics), frenesy corresponds to the time-symmetric component of the action functional, which includes trajectory-dependent quantities such as escape rates, undirected traffic, and total configuration changes. As with many physical observables, the change in frenesy is often the relevant measurable quantity, especially in the context of non-equilibrium response theory.

The role of dynamical activity in trajectory ensembles was explored in the study of large deviations. The need to characterize the time-symmetric fluctuation sector was emphasized in another 2006 paper by Christian Maes et al. Earlier work had referred to this quantity as "traffic". A year later, the term "frenetic" was introduced in the framework of response theory.

Mathematically, for stochastic trajectories obeying local detailed balance, entropy production quantifies the asymmetry between forward and time-reversed paths, while frenesy quantifies the symmetric contribution invariant under time reversal. It therefore measures changes in dynamical activity or quiescence relative to a reference process and level of description.

== Role in fluctuation–response ==
Frenesy contributes to the generalization of fluctuation–dissipation relations beyond equilibrium. In non-equilibrium steady states, the linear response of an observable depends on correlations with both entropy production and frenesy. This correction helps describe response phenomena in systems driven far from equilibrium.

Extending the Kubo and Green–Kubo formalisms, non-equilibrium linear response theory decomposes the response into an "entropic" term and a "frenetic" term. The frenetic component is absent in equilibrium but becomes significant under external driving forces. This behavior appears in non-equilibrium versions of the Sutherland–Einstein relation, where mobility depends not only on the diffusion matrix of the unperturbed system but also on force–current correlations. The frenetic term can lead to negative responses, such as in differential mobility or non-equilibrium specific heats. This effect—where the response decreases despite stronger driving—has theoretical support in several models. Frenetic corrections also emerge in higher-order nonlinear response expansions around equilibrium.

A frenetic component is likewise found in corrections to the fluctuation–dissipation relation of the second kind, known as the Einstein relation. Here, linear friction contains both entropic and frenetic contributions. The entropic term is linked to thermal noise, while the frenetic part can be negative and, in some cases, dominant enough to produce an overall negative friction.

== Applications ==
A van der Pol oscillator models oscillations with nonlinear amplification and damping. It has been used to model a biological heartbeat. Frenetic control may play a role in analysis of these systems.

== See also ==
- Non-equilibrium thermodynamics
- Stochastic thermodynamics
- Fluctuation theorem
- Linear response theory
