= Kubo (surname) =

Kubo (written: 窪 or 久保) is a Japanese surname. Notable people with the surname include:

- Asaka Kubo (born 1979), lead singer of the musical group A+Jyuc
- Hanae Kubo (久保 英恵; born 1982), Japanese ice hockey player
- Junko Kubo (born 1972), Japanese television announcer
- Kanji Kubo (久保 皖司; born 1938), Japanese sport shooter
- Märt Kubo (born 1944), Estonian theatre pedagogue, critic and politician
- Misumi Kubo (窪 美澄; born 1965), Japanese writer
- Noriko Kubo (久保 紀子; born 1972), Japanese fencer
- Rintaro Kubo (久保 凜太郎; born 1993), Japanese racing driver
- Ryogo Kubo (1920–1995), Japanese mathematical physicist
- Seiichiro Kubo (久保 征一郎; born 2001), Japanese footballer
- Shinji Kubo, a fictional character from The Sound of Waves
- Shogo Kubo (1959–2014), member of a group of skateboarders called Z-Boys
- Shiori Kubo (久保史緒里; born 2001), Japanese tarento, actress and radio personality
- Takefusa Kubo (久保 建英; born 2001), Japanese footballer
- Takuro Kubo (born 1971), member of the Japanese rock band GLAY
- Tatsuhiko Kubo (born 1976), Japanese footballer
- Tite Kubo (born 1977), Japanese manga artist
- Tokuko Kubo (久保 徳子; born 1952), Japanese handball player
- Toshiaki Kubo (born 1975), Japanese shogi player
- Wataru Kubo (1929–2003), Japanese politician
- Yurika Kubo (born 1989), Japanese voice actress and singer
- Yuya Kubo (born 1993), Japanese footballer

== See also ==
- Kuboyama (久保山)
