= Herbert Callen =

American physicist (1919–1993)

Herbert Bernard Callen
- Born: July 1, 1919; Philadelphia, Pennsylvania, US
- Died: May 22, 1993 (aged 73); Merion, Pennsylvania, US
- Education: Temple University (A.B. 1941, A.M. 1942); MIT (PhD 1947)
- Known for: Fluctuation-dissipation theorem; Thermodynamics (1960, 1985)
- Scientific career
- Fields: Thermodynamics; Statistical mechanics
- Workplaces: University of Pennsylvania
- Thesis: On the Theory of Irreversible Processes (1947)
- Doctoral advisor: Laszlo Tisza
- Doctoral students: Robert Swendsen

Herbert Bernard Callen (July 1, 1919 – May 22, 1993) was an American physicist specializing in thermodynamics and statistical mechanics. He is considered one of the founders of the modern theory of irreversible thermodynamics, and is the author of the classic textbook Thermodynamics and an Introduction to Thermostatistics, published in two editions. He is also known for developing the fluctuation–dissipation theorem. During World War II, his services were invoked in the theoretical division of the Manhattan Project.

== Life and work ==
=== Early years and studies ===
A native of Philadelphia, Herbert Callen received his bachelor's degree in physics from Temple University in 1941 and his master's degree from the institution the following year. His graduate studies were interrupted by the Manhattan Project, during which he worked for the Kellex Corporation in New York and on a U.S. Navy project concerning guided missiles (Project Bumblebee) at Princeton University in 1945. Callen subsequently completed his PhD in physics at the Massachusetts Institute of Technology (MIT), where was supervised by the physicist László Tisza. His doctoral dissertation, titled On the Theory of Irreversible Processes (1947), concerns the Kelvin thermoelectric and thermomagnetic relations, and Lars Onsager's reciprocal relations. Upon receiving his PhD, Callen spent a year at the MIT Laboratory for Insulation Research and developed his theory of electrical breakdown for insulators.

=== University of Pennsylvania ===
In 1948, Callen joined the faculty of the department of physics at the University of Pennsylvania and became a professor in 1956. Specialists consider his most lasting contribution to physics to be the paper co-written with Theodore A. Welton presenting a proof of the fluctuation–dissipation theorem, an extremely general result describing how a system's response to perturbations relates to its behavior at equilibrium. This crucial result became the basis for the statistical theory of irreversible processes and explains how fluctuations dissipate energy into heat in general and the phenomenon of Nyquist noise in particular. Callen then pioneered the thermodynamic Green's functions for magnetism. With his students, he studied many-body problems involving spin operators. This led to the discovery of some useful methods of approximations.

He was a successful teacher, noted for his ability to explain complicated phenomena in simple terms. He played a key role in the recruitment of promising solid-state physicists to the University of Pennsylvania in the late 1950s and continued to be active in the university's academic affairs till his retirement in 1985. Commenting on his own approach to science, Callen noted the importance of "inspired insight guided by faith in the simplicity of nature."

=== Retirement and death ===
He retired in 1985. After battling Alzheimer's disease for eleven years, Callen died in the Philadelphia suburb of Merion in 1993. He was 73 years old. He was survived by his wife, Sara Smith, and their two children, Jed and Jill.

== Book ==
The first edition of his classic text Thermodynamics and an Introduction to Thermostatistics was published in 1960. In it, he presents a rigorous axiomatic treatment of thermodynamics in which the state functions are the fundamental entities and the processes are their differentials. The postulates concern the existence of thermal equilibrium, and the properties of entropy. From them, he derives the fundamentals of thermodynamics, found in the first eight chapters. The much revised second edition, published in 1985, became a highly cited reference in the literature and an enduring textbook.

== Honor and awards ==
He was the recipient of a Guggenheim Fellowship for the academic year 1972–1973. In 1984, Callen received the Elliott Cresson Medal from the Franklin Institute. He was made a member of the National Academy of Sciences in 1990.

== See also ==
- List of textbooks in thermodynamics and statistical mechanics
- Richard Chase Tolman
- Constantin Carathéodory, who also sought an axiomatic formulation of thermodynamics
