= Disease package =

Type of plant disease

In plant science, the disease package of a cultivar is the susceptibility/resistance of that cultivar, in vague overall terms. It is not precise in the absolute sense but is meant to be useful when comparing one cultivar to another, relatively.
