= Theodore A. Welton =

American physicist (1918–2010)

Theodore "Ted" Allen Welton
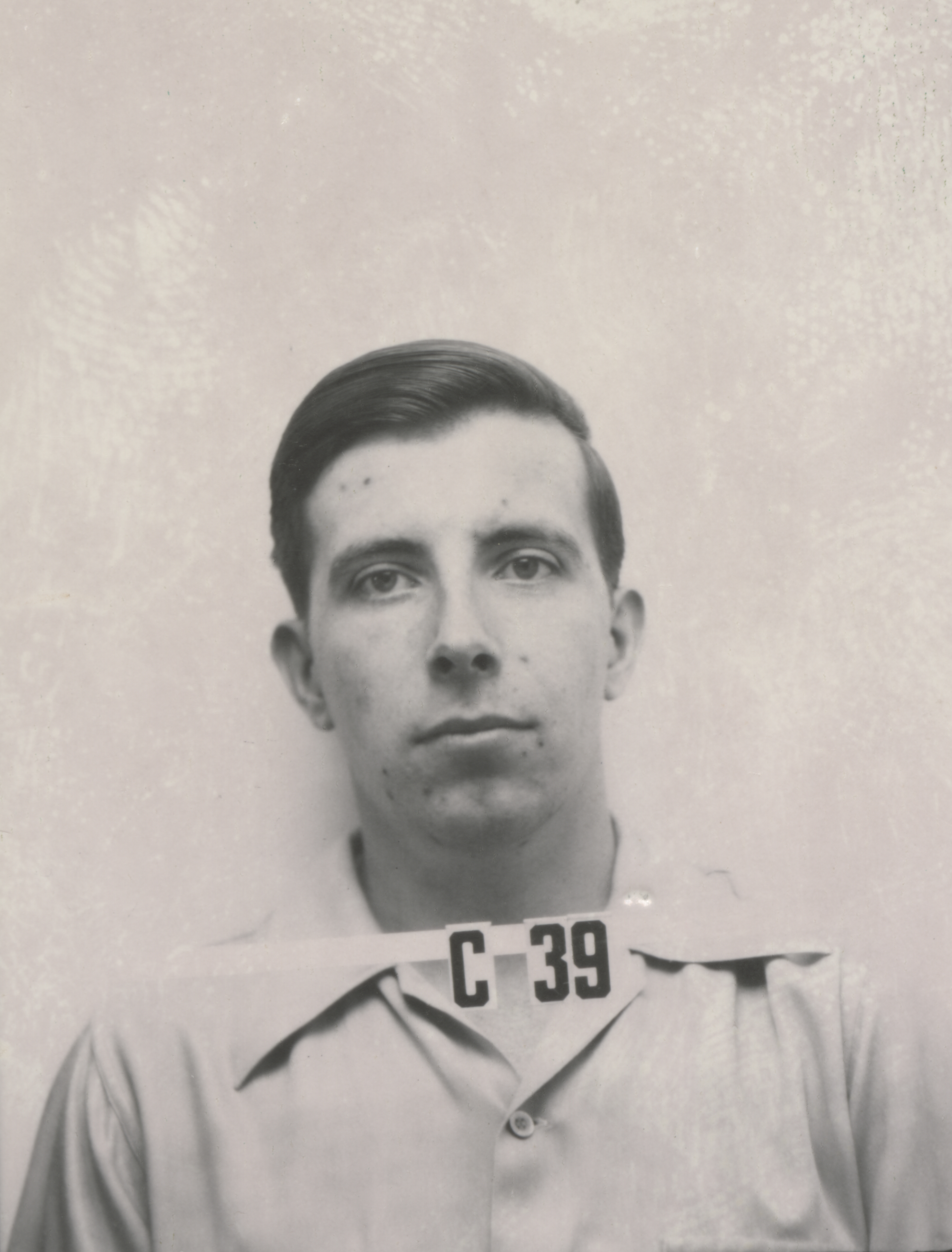
- Ted Welton's Los Alamos ID
- Born: Theodore Allen Welton; July 4, 1918; Saratoga Springs, New York, United States
- Died: November 14, 2010 (aged 92); Pleasant Hill, Tennessee
- Other name: Ted
- Education: Massachusetts Institute of Technology
- Known for: Fluctuation-dissipation theorem, Lamb shift, Manhattan Project
- Children: 4
- Awards: Humboldt Prize, Fellow of the American Physical Society
- Scientific career
- Fields: Physics
- Thesis: Multiple and cascade processes produced by electrons and gamma-rays
- Doctoral advisor: Maurice Goldhaber

Theodore "Ted" Allen Welton (July 4, 1918 – November 14, 2010) was an American theoretical physicist best known as the co-author of the fluctuation dissipation theorem. During 1944 and 1945 he worked at Project Y in Los Alamos, New Mexico on nuclear weapons in Richard Feynman's T-4 Group after being recruited by Feynman.

Welton was born in Saratoga Springs, New York and educated at the Massachusetts Institute of Technology, where he received a B.S. degree in 1939. He received his Ph.D. from the University of Illinois in 1944.

He worked at Los Alamos National Laboratory on diffusion problems during the Manhattan Project and was present at the Trinity Test.

After World War II he taught at MIT and the University of Pennsylvania. In 1948, he gave a simple qualitative description of the quantum electrodynamic corrections in atomic physics such as the Lamb shift as the interaction of non-relativistic treated electrons with stochastic quantum mechanical fluctuations of the electrodynamic field in the vacuum state, the mean value of which vanishes, but the standard deviation does not. In 1950 he worked at Oak Ridge National Laboratory in the Theoretical Physics Division; and in the following year, with Herbert Callen, he published the landmark fluctuation-dissipation theorem, showing that the explanations of Brownian motion and Johnson noise are specific examples of the more general theorem. Over the course of his career, Welton contributed to the development of nuclear reactors, and worked on particle physics and electron microscopy.

In 1953, he became a Fellow of the American Physical Society. He also received a Humboldt Prize for his work in physics.

He was married twice and had four children from his first marriage.
