= Rise over thermal =

In wireless communication systems, the rise over thermal (ROT) indicates the ratio between the total interference received on a base station and the thermal noise.

The ROT is a measurement of congestion of a cellular telephone network. The acceptable level of ROT is often used to define the capacity of systems using CDMA (code-division multiple access).
