= Thermodynamics and an Introduction to Thermostatistics =

Textbook by Herbert Callen

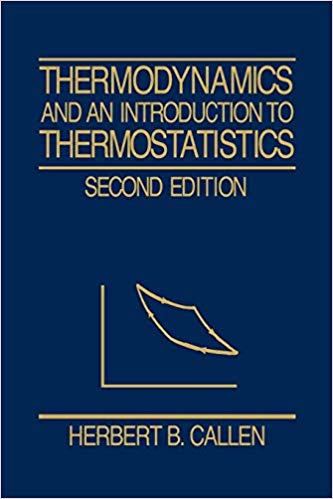
- Second edition front cover
- Author: Herbert Callen
- Language: English
- Subjects: Thermodynamics; Statistical mechanics
- Genre: Non-fiction
- Published: 1960, 1985
- Publisher: John Wiley & Sons
- Publication place: United States
- Media type: Print
- Pages: xx + 487
- ISBN: 978-0-471-86256-7 (2nd ed.)

Thermodynamics and an Introduction to Thermostatistics is a textbook written by Herbert Callen that presents classical thermodynamics in an abstract and axiomatic approach. The textbook contains three parts, each building upon the previous. The first edition was published in 1960 and a second followed in 1985.

== Overview ==
The first part of the book starts by presenting the problem thermodynamics is trying to solve, and provides the postulates on which the field is founded. It then develops upon this foundation to discuss reversible processes, heat engines, thermodynamics potentials, Maxwell's relations, stability of thermodynamics systems, and first-order phase transitions. As the author lays down the basics of thermodynamics, he then goes to discuss more advanced topics such as critical phenomena and irreversible processes.

The second part of the text presents the foundations of classical statistical mechanics. Boltzmann's entropy formula is introduced and used to describe the Einstein model, the two-state system, and the polymer model. Afterwards, the different statistical ensembles are discussed from which the thermodynamics potentials are derived. Quantum fluids and fluctuations are also discussed.

The last part of the text is a brief discussion on symmetry and the conceptual foundations of thermostatistics. In the final chapter, Callen advances his thesis that the symmetries of the fundamental laws of physics underlie the very foundations of thermodynamics and seeks to illuminate the crucial role thermodynamics plays in science.

Callen advises that a one-semester course for advanced undergraduates should cover the first seven chapters plus chapters 15 and 16 if time permits.

== Second edition ==
=== Background ===
The second edition provides a descriptive account of the thermodynamics of critical phenomena, which progressed dramatically in the 1960s and 1970s. Drawing on feedback from students and instructors, Callen improved many explanations, explicitly solved examples, and added many exercises, many of which have complete or partial answers. He also provided an introduction to statistical mechanics with an emphasis on the core principles rather than the applications. However, he sought to neither separate thermodynamics and statistical mechanics completely nor subsume the former under the latter under the banner of "thermal physics." Indeed, thermal physics courses often emphasizes statistical mechanics at the expense of thermodynamics, despite its importance for industry, as a survey of business leaders conducted by the American Physical Society in 1971 suggested. Callen observed that thermodynamics had subsequently been de-emphasized.

== Reception ==
Robert B. Griffiths, a specialist in thermodynamics and statistical mechanics at the Carnegie Mellon University, commented that both editions of this book presents clearly and concisely the core of thermodynamics within the first eight chapters. At the time of writing (1987), Griffiths knew of books that explained the principles of thermodynamics, but Callen's was the best presentation of the material. He believed Callen offered a pedagogical, if abrupt, treatment of the subject. His book begins in an abstract manner, assuming the existence and properties of entropy and derive the consequences for various processes of interest rather than through heat engines and thermodynamic cycles or by statistical mechanics and Boltzmann's entropy formula $S = k \ln \Omega$. However, he argued that Callen's treatment of critical phenomena (Chapter 10) contains some technical flaws. Callen thought that classical analysis had broken down. But Griffiths wrote that the problem lies not in the breakdown of thermodynamics but rather the Taylor-expansion of thermodynamic quantities, and that precise expressions of the functions appearing in a fundamental relation should be determined by statistical mechanics and experiments, not thermodynamics. Nevertheless, Griffiths still believed this book to be an excellent resource for learning the basics of thermodynamics.

According to H. L. Scott, who studied statistical mechanics and biophysics at Oklahoma State University, Thermodynamics and an Introduction to Thermostatistics is a popular textbook that begins with some basic postulates based on intuitive classical, empirical, and macroscopic arguments. He found that it is remarkable for the whole edifice of classical thermodynamics to follow from just a few basic assumptions. However, Scott preferred the discussion of temperature in Heat and Thermodynamics by Mark W. Zemansky and Richard H. Dittman because it is based on thermometry and forces students to contemplate the empirical basis of concept of temperature, leaving aside the molecular basis of heat. He argued that such an approach yields greater appreciation for the meaning of temperature and its statistical-mechanical basis which students will encounter later. In contrast, Callen's book does not mention temperature till Chapter 2, where Callen defines temperature as the reciprocal of the derivative of entropy with respect to internal energy then shows, using the postulates, that this definition is consistent with our intuition. While Zemansky and Dittman cover the first law of thermodynamics empirically, Callen simply assumes the existence of the internal energy function the invokes the conservative nature of inter-atomic forces. Whereas Zemansky and Dittman treated the second law of thermodynamics using heat engines and simply state the Clausius and Kelvin formulations of it, in Callen's book, the second law is contained within the postulates. Scott was unsure which approach is more understandable for students. In general, Zemansky and Dittman employed an empirical approach while that of Callen is deductive. Scott opined that Zemansky and Dittman's book is more suitable for beginning students while Callen's is more appropriate for an advanced course or as a reference.

== See also ==
- List of textbooks in thermodynamics and statistical mechanics
- List of textbooks on classical mechanics and quantum mechanics
