= Kubo gap =

Average spacing between consecutive energy levels

In atomic physics, the Kubo gap is the average spacing that exists between consecutive energy levels. The units of measure are meV or millielectron volts. It varies with an inverse relationship to the nuclearity. It is named after Ryogo Kubo.

As the material in question is viewed from the bulk and atomic levels, we can see that the kubo gap goes from a smaller to larger value respectively. As the Kubo gap increases there is also a decrease in the density of states located at the Fermi level. The Kubo gap can also have an effect on the properties associated with the material. It is possible to control the Kubo gap which will then cause the system to become metallic or nonmetallic. The electrical conductivity and magnetic susceptibility are also both influenced by the Kubo gap and vary according to the relative size of the Kubo gap.

== See also ==
- Nanoparticle
- Quantum dot
