= Robert Swendsen =

American physicist

Robert H. Swendsen
- Education: University of Pennsylvania
- Scientific career
- Fields: Physics
- Workplaces: Carnegie Mellon University
- Thesis: The europium chalcogenides as Heisenberg Ferromagnets (1971)
- Doctoral advisor: Herbert Callen

Robert Haakon Swendsen is a professor of physics at Carnegie Mellon University. He is known in the computational physics community for the Swendsen-Wang algorithm, the Monte Carlo Renormalization Group, and related methods that enable efficient computational studies of equilibrium phenomena near phase transitions. He is the 2014 Recipient of the Aneesur Rahman Prize for Computational Physics from the American Physical Society.

Swendsen completed his undergraduate studies at Yale University and his PhD at University of Pennsylvania.

Swendsen is also known for his pedagogy. He received Carnegie Mellon's Julius Ashkin Teaching Award in 2014 He is also known for his textbook, An Introduction to Statistical Mechanics and Thermodynamics (2nd ed. 2020). Oxford University Press.
