= John Bertrand Johnson =

Swedish scientist (1887–1970)

- Born: Johan Erik Bertrand; October 2, 1887; Gothenburg, Sweden
- Died: November 27, 1970 (aged 83); Orange, New Jersey, U.S.
- Education: Yale University
- Known for: Johnson–Nyquist noise
- Awards: Edward Longstreth Medal (1957); IEEE David Sarnoff Award (1970)
- Scientific career
- Fields: Electronic engineer
- Workplaces: Bell Laboratories

John Erik Bertrand Johnson (born Johan Erik Bertrand; October 2, 1887 – November 27, 1970) was a Swedish-born American electrical engineer and physicist. He created the first cathode-ray tube oscilloscope and detailed a fundamental source of random interference with information traveling on wires, now called Johnson–Nyquist noise.

== Early life ==
Johan Erik Bertrand was born in Gothenburg, Sweden on October 2, 1887 to the 20-year-old, unmarried Augusta Johansdotte. The family had lived in extreme poverty until his uncle John A. Johnson helped them emigrate to the United States. The younger John emigrated to the United States on July 3, 1904 where his uncle arranged for his education. He graduated from the University of North Dakota in 1913, receiving his Masters degree the following year.

== Career ==
Johnson received a PhD in Physics at Yale University in 1917, after which he went to work for Western Electric in their engineering department, primarily studying ionized gases. There he experimented with the Braun tube, a tool used by electrical engineers in radio engineering. Jonathan Zenneck had proved the possibility of creating visible waveforms electronically using a Braun tube, but it was not reliable due to power and noise interference. Johnson fixed this problem by adding a hot cathode to the mechanism, creating a system which could operate at 300 volts instead of tens of thousands. It was the first fully functional vector graphic oscilloscope.

His results were first published in Physical Review and later the Bell System Technical Journal in 1922. The tool was immediately put to use by electrical engineers, especially those working in radio. This was commercialized by Western Electric in 1924 as the Cathode-Ray Oscillograph and attracted a wide array of interest from the mainstream press when it was used to show the waveforms of recorded voice.

Johnson joined the staff of Bell Telephone Laboratories in 1925. In 1928, he published the journal paper "Thermal Agitation of Electricity in Conductors". In electronic systems, thermal noise (now also called Johnson noise) is the noise generated by thermal agitation of electrons in a conductor. Johnson's papers showed a statistical fluctuation of electric charge occur in all electrical conductors, producing random variation of potential between the conductor ends (such as in vacuum tube amplifiers and thermocouples). Thermal noise power, per hertz, is equal throughout the frequency spectrum. Johnson deduced that thermal noise is intrinsic to all resistors and is not a sign of poor design or manufacture, although resistors may also have excess noise.

Johnson was possibly among the first people to make a working field effect transistor, based on Julius Edgar Lilienfeld's US Patent 1,900,018 of 1928. In sworn testimony to the U.S. patent office in 1949, Johnson reported "...although the modulation index of 11 per cent is not great,...the useful output power is substantial...it is in principle operative as an amplifier". On the other hand, in an article in 1964 he denied the operability of Lilienfeld's patent, saying "I tried conscientiously to reproduce Lilienfeld's structure according to his specification and could observe no amplification or even modulation."

In 1952, Johnson joined the Edison Laboratory and served as the head of the physics department until 1957. He retired, but subsequently joined McGraw-Edison's Instrument division until retiring again in 1969.

== Personal life ==
In 1919 he married Clara Louisa Conger (d.1961) and in 1961 he married Ruth Marie Severtson Bowden. He had two sons by his first marriage, Bertrand Conger and Alan William. John Bertrand Johnson died aged 83 in Orange, New Jersey, US, on November 27, 1970.

== See also ==
- Johnson–Nyquist noise
- Timeline of thermodynamics, statistical mechanics, and random processes

== External articles and references ==
- J. B. Johnson, "Thermal Agitation of Electricity in Conductors". The American Physical Society, 1928.
- Federal Standard 1037C and MIL-STD-188
