= Linear response function =

Relationship of a signal transducer

A linear response function describes the input-output relationship of a signal transducer, such as a radio turning electromagnetic waves into music or a neuron turning synaptic input into a response. Because of its many applications in information theory, physics and engineering there exist alternative names for specific linear response functions such as susceptibility, impulse response or impedance; see also transfer function. The concept of a Green's function or fundamental solution of an ordinary differential equation is closely related.

== Mathematical definition ==
Denote the input of a system by $h(t)$ (e.g. a force), and the response of the system by $x(t)$ (e.g. a position). Generally, the value of $x(t)$ will depend not only on the present value of $h(t)$, but also on past values. Approximately $x(t)$ is a weighted sum of the previous values of $h(t')$, with the weights given by the linear response function $\chi(t-t')$:
$$x(t) = \int_{-\infty}^t dt'\, \chi(t-t') h(t') + \cdots\,.$$

The explicit term on the right-hand side is the leading order term of a Volterra expansion for the full nonlinear response. If the system in question is highly non-linear, higher order terms in the expansion, denoted by the dots, become important and the signal transducer cannot adequately be described just by its linear response function.

The complex-valued Fourier transform $\tilde{\chi}(\omega)$ of the linear response function is very useful as it describes the output of the system if the input is a sine wave $h(t) = h_0 \sin(\omega t)$ with frequency $\omega$. The output reads

$$x(t) = \left|\tilde{\chi}(\omega)\right| h_0 \sin(\omega t+\arg\tilde{\chi}(\omega))\,,$$

with amplitude gain $|\tilde{\chi}(\omega)|$ and phase shift $\arg\tilde{\chi}(\omega)$.

== Example ==
Consider a damped harmonic oscillator with input given by an external driving force $h(t)$,

$$\ddot{x}(t)+\gamma \dot{x}(t)+\omega_0^2 x(t) = h(t).$$

The complex-valued Fourier transform of the linear response function is given by

$$\tilde{\chi}(\omega) = \frac{\tilde{x}(\omega)}{\tilde{h}(\omega)} = \frac{1}{\omega_0^2-\omega^2+i\gamma\omega}.$$

The amplitude gain is given by the magnitude of the complex number $\tilde\chi (\omega ),$ and the phase shift by the arctan of the imaginary part of the function divided by the real one.

From this representation, we see that for small $\gamma$ the Fourier transform $\tilde{\chi}(\omega)$ of the linear response function yields a pronounced maximum ("Resonance") at the frequency $\omega\approx\omega_0$. The linear response function for a harmonic oscillator is mathematically identical to that of an RLC circuit. The width of the maximum, $\Delta\omega ,$ typically is much smaller than $\omega_0 ,$ so that the Quality factor $Q:=\omega_0 /\Delta\omega$ can be extremely large.

== Kubo formula ==
The exposition of linear response theory, in the context of quantum statistics, can be found in a paper by Ryogo Kubo. This defines particularly the Kubo formula, which considers the general case that the "force" h(t) is a perturbation of the basic operator of the system, the Hamiltonian, $\hat H_0 \to \hat{H}_0 -h(t')\hat{B}(t')$ where $\hat B$ corresponds to a measurable quantity as input, while the output x(t) is the perturbation of the thermal expectation of another measurable quantity $\hat A(t)$. The Kubo formula then defines the quantum-statistical calculation of the susceptibility $\chi ( t -t' )$ by a general formula involving only the mentioned operators.

As a consequence of the principle of causality the complex-valued function $\tilde{\chi }(\omega )$ has poles only in the lower half-plane. This leads to the Kramers–Kronig relations, which relates the real and the imaginary parts of $\tilde{\chi }(\omega )$ by integration. The simplest example is once more the damped harmonic oscillator.

== Nonequilibrium linear response formula ==
Linear response theory has versions for nonequilibrium processes for open systems where there is no detailed balance but a steady driving or agitation is applied. A small perturbation of these driven or active systems gives rise to a response in violation with the equilibrium expressions. A possible methodology proceeds via path-space ensembles where the probabilities of trajectories are evaluated; see e.g. The resulting response formulae have an entropic part (similar to the detailed balance case) and a frenetic part. The latter involves the correlation of the (excess) frenesy (due to the perturbation) with the observable. In detailed balance, the two contributions merge and reproduce the Kubo and Green-Kubo formulae. Out of detailed balance, the frenetic contribution is responsible for the possibility of negative heat capacities and mobilities, and they do not longer measure a fluctuation, e.g. in terms of a variance of the energy or of the current.

== See also ==
- Convolution
- Green–Kubo relations
- Fluctuation theorem
- Dispersion (optics)
- Lindbladian
- Semilinear response
- Green's function
- Impulse response
- Resolvent formalism
- Propagator
- Frenesy
