= Kuboyama =

Kuboyama (Japanese: 久保山) is a Japanese surname. Notable people with the surname include:

- Haruna Kuboyama (born 1996), Japanese sprinter
- Yoshikiyo Kuboyama (born 1976), Japanese footballer
