= Susceptibility =

Susceptibility may refer to:

== Physics and engineering ==
In physics the susceptibility is a quantification for the change of an extensive property under variation of an intensive property. The word may refer to:

- In physics, the susceptibility of a material or substance describes its response to an applied field. For example:
  - Magnetic susceptibility
  - Electric susceptibility
- The two types of susceptibility above are examples of a linear response function; sometimes the terms susceptibility and linear response function are used interchangeably.
- In electromagnetic compatibility (EMC), susceptibility is the sensitivity of a device's function to incoming electromagnetic interference

== Health and medicine ==
- In epidemiology, a susceptible individual is a member of a population who is at risk of becoming infected by a disease
- In microbiology, pharmacology, and medicine drug susceptibility is the ability of a microorganism to be inhibited or killed by the drug, as in antibiotic susceptibility, the susceptibility of microorganisms to antibiotics (often used synonymously with the lay term sensitivity)

== Botany and environmental science ==
- Susceptibility to pathogens is the extent to which a plant, vegetation complex, or ecological community would suffer from a pathogen if exposed, without regard to the likelihood of exposure – the opposite of Plant disease resistance
  - It should not be confused with vulnerability, which by convention in this field takes into account both the effect of exposure and the likelihood of exposure

== Military science ==
- The vulnerability of a target audience to particular forms of psychological warfare

== See also ==
- Vulnerability
