= Johnson–Nyquist noise =

Electrical noise due to thermal vibration within a conductor

Figure 1. Johnson's 1927 experiment showed that if thermal noise from a resistance of $\text{R}$ with temperature $\text{T}$ is bandlimited to bandwidth $\Delta f$, then its root mean squared voltage $(V_\text{rms})$ is $\sqrt{ 4 k_\text{B} TR \Delta f }$ in general, where $k_\text{B}$ is the Boltzmann constant.

Johnson–Nyquist noise (thermal noise, Johnson noise, or Nyquist noise) is the voltage or current noise generated by the thermal agitation of the charge carriers (usually the electrons) inside an electrical conductor at equilibrium, which happens regardless of any applied voltage. Thermal noise is present in all electrical circuits, and in sensitive electronic equipment (such as radio receivers) it can drown out weak signals, and can be the limiting factor on sensitivity of electrical measuring instruments. Thermal noise is proportional to absolute temperature, so some sensitive electronic equipment such as radio telescope receivers are cooled to cryogenic temperatures to improve their signal-to-noise ratio. The generic, statistical physical derivation of this noise is called the fluctuation-dissipation theorem, where generalized impedance or generalized susceptibility is used to characterize the medium.

Figure 2. Johnson–Nyquist noise has a nearly a constant 4k_{B}TR power spectral density per unit of frequency, but does decay to zero due to quantum effects at high frequencies (terahertz for room temperature). This plot's horizontal axis uses a log scale such that every vertical line corresponds to a power of ten of frequency.

Thermal noise in an ideal resistor is approximately white, meaning that its power spectral density is nearly constant throughout the frequency spectrum (Figure 2). When limited to a finite bandwidth and viewed in the time domain (as sketched in Figure 1), thermal noise has a nearly Gaussian amplitude distribution.

For the general case, this definition applies to charge carriers in any type of conducting medium (e.g. ions in an electrolyte), not just resistors. Thermal noise is distinct from shot noise, which consists of additional current fluctuations that occur when a voltage is applied and a macroscopic current starts to flow.

== History of thermal noise ==
In 1905, in one of Albert Einstein's Annus mirabilis papers the theory of Brownian motion was first solved in terms of thermal fluctuations. The following year, in a second paper about Brownian motion, Einstein suggested that the same phenomena could be applied to derive thermally-agitated currents, but did not carry out the calculation as he considered it to be untestable.

Geertruida de Haas-Lorentz, daughter of Hendrik Lorentz, in her doctoral thesis of 1912, expanded on Einstein stochastic theory and first applied it to the study of electrons, deriving a formula for the mean-squared value of the thermal current.

Walter H. Schottky discovered shot noise in 1918, while studying Einstein's theories of thermal noise.

Frits Zernike working in electrical metrology, found unusual random deflections while working with high-sensitive galvanometers. He rejected the idea that the noise was mechanical, and concluded that it was of thermal nature. In 1927, he introduced the idea of autocorrelations to electrical measurements and calculated the time detection limit. His work coincided with De Haas-Lorentz's prediction.

The same year, working independently without any knowledge of Zernike's work, John B. Johnson working in Bell Labs found the same kind of noise in communication systems, but described it in terms of frequencies. He described his findings to Harry Nyquist, also at Bell Labs, who used principles of thermodynamics and statistical mechanics to explain the results, published in 1928.

== Noise of ideal resistors for moderate frequencies ==
Figure 3. While thermal noise has an almost constant power spectral density of $4 k_\text{B} T R$, a band-pass filter with bandwidth $\Delta f {=} f_\text{upper} {-} f_\text{lower}$ passes only the shaded area of height $4 k_\text{B} T R$ and width $\Delta f$. Note: practical filters don't have brickwall cutoffs, so the left and right edges of this area are not perfectly vertical.

Johnson's experiment (Figure 1) found that the thermal noise from a resistance $R$ at kelvin temperature $T$ and bandlimited to a frequency band of bandwidth $\Delta f$ (Figure 3) has a mean square voltage of:

$$\overline {V_n^2} = 4 k_\text{B} T R \, \Delta f$$

where $k_{\rm B}$ is the Boltzmann constant (1.380649×10^{−23} J⋅K^{−1}). While this equation applies to ideal resistors (i.e. pure resistances without any frequency-dependence) at non-extreme frequency and temperatures, a more accurate Johnson–Nyquist noise § Generalized forms accounts for complex impedances and quantum effects. Conventional electronics generally operate over a more limited bandwidth, so Johnson's equation is often satisfactory.

=== Power spectral density ===
The mean square voltage per hertz of bandwidth is $4 k_\text{B} T R$ and may be called the power spectral density (Figure 2). (Note: This article is using "one-sided" (positive-only frequency) not "two-sided" frequency.) Its square root at room temperature (around 300 K) approximates to 0.13 $\sqrt{R}$, which has the unit nanovolts/√hertz. A 10 kΩ resistor, for example, would have approximately 13 nV/√Hz at room temperature.

=== RMS noise voltage ===
Figure 4. These circuits are equivalent: (A) A resistor at nonzero temperature with internal thermal noise; (B) Its Thévenin equivalent circuit: a noiseless resistor in series with a noise voltage source; (C) Its Norton equivalent circuit: a noiseless resistance in parallel with a noise current source.

The square root of the mean square voltage yields the root mean square (RMS) voltage observed over the bandwidth $\Delta f$:

$$V_\text{rms} = \sqrt{\overline {V_n^2}} = \sqrt{ 4 k_\text{B} T R \, \Delta f } \, .$$

A resistor with thermal noise can be represented by its Thévenin equivalent circuit (Figure 4B) consisting of a noiseless resistor in series with a gaussian noise voltage source with the above RMS voltage.

Around room temperature, 3 kΩ provides almost one microvolt of RMS noise over 20 kHz (the human hearing range) and 60 Ω·Hz for $R \, \Delta f$ corresponds to almost one nanovolt of RMS noise.

=== RMS noise current ===
A resistor with thermal noise can also be converted into its Norton equivalent circuit (Figure 4C) consisting of a noise-free resistor in parallel with a gaussian noise current source with the following RMS current:

$$I_\text{rms} = {V_\text{rms} \over R} = \sqrt {{4 k_\text{B} T \Delta f } \over R}.$$

== Thermal noise on capacitors ==
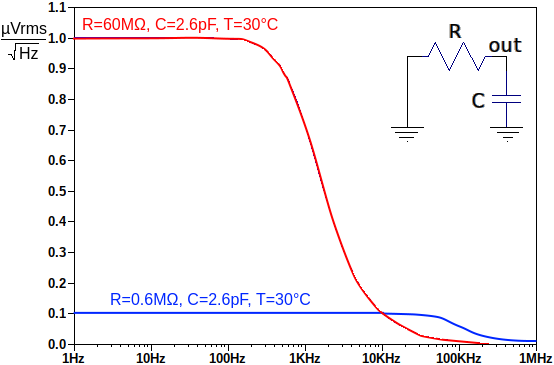
Voltage noise from two different values of resistor R on the same capacitor C. Even though increasing R by 100 times produces 10 times higher noise density in the low-frequency passband, it also reduces the low-pass filter's cutoff frequency by 1/100, so the total noise (summed over all frequencies) on C is identical.

Ideal capacitors, as lossless devices, do not have thermal noise. However, the combination of a resistor and a capacitor (an RC circuit, a common low-pass filter) has what is called kTC noise. The equivalent noise bandwidth of an RC circuit is $\Delta f {=} \tfrac{1}{4RC}.$ When this is substituted into the thermal noise equation, the result has an unusually simple form as the value of the resistance (R) drops out of the equation. This is because higher R decreases the bandwidth as much as it increases the spectral density of the noise in the passband.

The mean-square and RMS noise voltage generated in such a filter are:

$$\overline {V_\text{n}^2} = {4 k_\text{B} T R \over 4 R C} = {k_\text{B} T \over C}$$
$$V_\text{rms} = \sqrt{4 k_\text{B} T R \over 4 R C} = \sqrt{ k_\text{B} T \over C }.$$

The noise charge $Q_n$ is the capacitance times the voltage:

$$Q_n = C \, V_n = C \sqrt{ k_\text{B} T \over C } = \sqrt{ k_\text{B} T C }$$
$$\overline{Q_n^2} = C^2 \, \overline{V_n^2} = C^2 {k_\text{B} T \over C} = k_\text{B} T C$$

This charge noise is the origin of the term "kTC noise". Although independent of the resistor's value, all of the kTC noise arises in the resistor. Therefore, it would be incorrect to double-count both a resistor's thermal noise and its associated kTC noise, and the temperature of the resistor alone should be used, even if the resistor and the capacitor are at different temperatures. Some values are tabulated below:

Thermal noise on capacitors at 300 K
Capacitance	$V_\text{rms} {=} \sqrt{ k_\text{B} T \over C }$	Charge noise $Q_\text{n} {=} \sqrt{ k_\text{B} T C }$	
Capacitance	$V_\text{rms} {=} \sqrt{ k_\text{B} T \over C }$	as coulombs	as electrons (Note: The charge of a single electron is e^{−} (one negative elementary charge). So each number to the left of e^{−} represents the total number of electrons that make up the noise charge.)
1 fF	2 mV	2 aC	12.5 e^{−}
10 fF	640 μV	6.4 aC	40 e^{−}
100 fF	200 μV	20 aC	125 e^{−}
1 pF	64 μV	64 aC	400 e^{−}
10 pF	20 μV	200 aC	1250 e^{−}
100 pF	6.4 μV	640 aC	4000 e^{−}
1 nF	2 μV	2 fC	12500 e^{−}

=== Reset noise ===
An extreme case is the zero bandwidth limit called the reset noise left on a capacitor by opening an ideal switch. Though an ideal switch's open resistance is infinite, the formula still applies. However, now the RMS voltage must be interpreted not as a time average, but as an average over many such reset events, since the voltage is constant when the bandwidth is zero. In this sense, the Johnson noise of an RC circuit can be seen to be inherent, an effect of the thermodynamic distribution of the number of electrons on the capacitor, even without the involvement of a resistor.

The noise is not caused by the capacitor itself, but by the thermodynamic fluctuations of the amount of charge on the capacitor. Once the capacitor is disconnected from a conducting circuit, the thermodynamic fluctuation is frozen at a random value with standard deviation as given above. The reset noise of capacitive sensors is often a limiting noise source, for example in image sensors.

Any system in thermal equilibrium has state variables with a mean energy of kT/2 per degree of freedom. Using the formula for energy on a capacitor (E = 1/2CV^{2}), mean noise energy on a capacitor can be seen to also be 1/2CkT/C = kT/2. Thermal noise on a capacitor can be derived from this relationship, without consideration of resistance.

== Thermometry ==
The Johnson–Nyquist noise has applications in precision measurements, in which it is typically called "Johnson noise thermometry".

For example, the NIST in 2017 used the Johnson noise thermometry to measure the Boltzmann constant with uncertainty less than 3 ppm. It accomplished this by using Josephson voltage standard and a quantum Hall resistor, held at the triple-point temperature of water. The voltage is measured over a period of 100 days and integrated.

This was done in 2017, when the triple point of water's temperature was 273.16 K by definition, and the Boltzmann constant was experimentally measurable. Because the acoustic gas thermometry reached 0.2 ppm in uncertainty, and Johnson noise 2.8 ppm, this fulfilled the preconditions for a redefinition. After the 2019 redefinition, the kelvin was defined so that the Boltzmann constant has an exact value (1.380649×10^{−23} J⋅K^{−1}), and the triple point of water became experimentally measurable.

== Thermal noise on inductors ==
Inductors are the dual of capacitors. Analogous to kTC noise, a resistor with an inductor $L$ results in a noise current that is independent of resistance:

$$\overline {I_\text{n}^2} = {k_\text{B} T \over L} \, .$$

== Maximum transfer of noise power ==
The noise generated at a resistor $R_\text{S}$ can transfer to the remaining circuit. The maximum power transfer happens when the Thévenin equivalent resistance $R_{\rm L}$ of the remaining circuit matches $R_\text{S}$. In this case, each of the two resistors dissipates noise in both itself and in the other resistor. Since only half of the source voltage drops across any one of these resistors, this maximum noise power transfer is:

$$P_\text{max} = k_\text{B} \,T \Delta f \, .$$

This maximum is independent of the resistance and is called the available noise power from a resistor.

=== Available noise power level ===
Signal power is often measured as a level with the unit dBm (decibels relative to 1 milliwatt). Available noise power level would thus be $10\ \log_{10}(\tfrac{k_\text{B} T \Delta f}{\text{1 mW}})$ in dBm. At room temperature (300 K), the available noise power can be easily approximated as $10\ \log_{10}(\Delta f) - 173.8$ in dBm for a bandwidth in hertz. Some example available noise power levels are tabulated below:

Bandwidth $(\Delta f )$	Available thermal noise power level at 300 K [dBm]	Notes
1 Hz	−174	
10 Hz	−164	
100 Hz	−154	
1 kHz	−144	
10 kHz	−134	FM channel of 2-way radio
100 kHz	−124	
180 kHz	−121.45	One LTE resource block
200 kHz	−121	GSM channel
1 MHz	−114	Bluetooth channel
2 MHz	−111	Commercial GPS channel
3.84 MHz	−108	UMTS channel
6 MHz	−106	Analog television channel
20 MHz	−101	WLAN 802.11 channel
40 MHz	−98	WLAN 802.11n 40 MHz channel
80 MHz	−95	WLAN 802.11ac 80 MHz channel
160 MHz	−92	WLAN 802.11ac 160 MHz channel
1 GHz	−84	UWB channel

== Nyquist's derivation of ideal resistor noise ==
Figure 5. Schematic of Nyquist's 1928 thought experiment using two noisy resistors (each represented here by a noise-free resistor in series with a noise voltage source) connected via a long lossless transmission line of length $l$. Each resistor's noise signal propagates across the line at velocity $\text{v}$. All impedances are identical, so both signals are absorbed by the opposite resistor instead of being reflected. Nyquist then imagined shorting both ends of the line, thereby trapping in-flight energy on the line. Because all in-flight energy is now completely reflected (due to the now-mismatched impedance), the in-flight energy can be represented as a summation of sinusoidal standing waves. For a band of frequencies $\Delta f$, there are $2l \, \Delta f / \text{v}$ modes of oscillation. (Note: A standing wave occurs with frequency equal to every integer multiple of $\tfrac{\text{v}}{2l}$. The line is sufficiently long to make the number of modes within the bandwidth very large, such that the modes will be close enough in frequency to approximate a continuous frequency spectrum.) Each mode provides $k_{\rm B} T$ of energy on average, of which $k_{\rm B} T / 2$ is electric and $k_{\rm B} T / 2$ is magnetic, so the total energy in that bandwidth on average is $k_{\rm B} T \cdot 2l \, \Delta f / \text{v} .$ Each resistor contributed $k_{\rm B} T \cdot l \, \Delta f / \text{v}$ (half of that total energy). But since before the shorting there were originally no reflections, the value of that total in-flight energy also equals the combined energy that was transferred from both resistors to the line during the transit time interval of $l / \text{v}$. Dividing the average energy transferred from each resistor to the line by the transit time interval results in a total power of $k_{\rm B} T \, \Delta f$ transferred over bandwidth $\Delta f$ on average from each resistor.

Nyquist's 1928 paper "Thermal Agitation of Electric Charge in Conductors" used concepts about potential energy and harmonic oscillators from the equipartition law of Boltzmann and Maxwell to explain Johnson's experimental result. Nyquist's thought experiment summed the energy contribution of each standing wave mode of oscillation on a long lossless transmission line between two equal resistors ($R_1 {=} R_2$). According to the conclusion of Figure 5, the total average power transferred over bandwidth $\Delta f$ from $R_1$ and absorbed by $R_2$ was determined to be:

$$\overline {P_1} = k_{\rm B} T \, \Delta f \, .$$

Simple application of Ohm's law says the current from $V_1$ (the thermal voltage noise of only $R_1$) through the combined resistance is $I_1 {=} \tfrac{V_1}{R_1 + R_2} {=} \tfrac{V_1}{2R_1}$, so the power transferred from $R_1$ to $R_2$ is the square of this current multiplied by $R_2$, which simplifies to:

$$P_\text{1} = I_1^2 R_2 = I_1^2 R_1 = \left( \frac{V_1}{2R_1} \right)^2 R_1 = \frac{V_1^2}{4R_1}  \, .$$

Setting this $P_\text{1}$ equal to the earlier average power expression $\overline {P_1}$ allows solving for the average of $V_1^2$ over that bandwidth:

$$\overline{V_1^2} = 4 k_\text{B} T {R_1} \, \Delta f \, .$$

Nyquist used similar reasoning to provide a generalized expression that applies to non-equal and complex impedances too. And while Nyquist above used $k_{\rm B} T$ according to classical theory, Nyquist concluded his paper by attempting to use a more involved expression that incorporated the Planck constant $h$ (from the new theory of quantum mechanics).

== Generalized forms ==
The $4 k_\text{B} T R$ voltage noise described above is a special case for a purely resistive component for low to moderate frequencies. In general, the thermal electrical noise continues to be related to resistive response in many more generalized electrical cases, as a consequence of the fluctuation-dissipation theorem. Below a variety of generalizations are noted. All of these generalizations share a common limitation, that they only apply in cases where the electrical component under consideration is purely passive and linear.

=== Complex impedances ===
Nyquist's original paper also provided the generalized noise for components having partly reactive response, e.g., sources that contain capacitors or inductors. Such a component can be described by a frequency-dependent complex electrical impedance $Z(f)$. The formula for the power spectral density of the series noise voltage is

$$S_{v_n v_n}(f) = 4 k_\text{B} T \eta(f) \operatorname{Re}[Z(f)].$$

The function $\eta(f)$ is approximately 1, except at very high frequencies or near absolute zero (see below).

The real part of impedance, $\operatorname{Re}[Z(f)]$, is in general frequency dependent and so the Johnson–Nyquist noise is not white noise. The RMS noise voltage over a span of frequencies $f_1$ to $f_2$ can be found by taking the square root of integration of the power spectral density:

$$V_\text{rms} = \sqrt{\int_{f_1}^{f_2} S_{v_n v_n}(f) df}$$.

Alternatively, a parallel noise current can be used to describe Johnson noise, its power spectral density being

$$S_{i_n i_n}(f) = 4 k_\text{B} T \eta(f) \operatorname{Re}[Y(f)].$$

where $Y(f) {=} \tfrac{1}{Z(f)}$ is the electrical admittance; note that $\operatorname{Re}[Y(f)] {=} \tfrac{\operatorname{Re}[Z(f)]}{|Z(f)|^2} \, .$

=== Quantum effects at high frequencies or low temperatures ===
With proper consideration of quantum effects (which are relevant for very high frequencies or very low temperatures near absolute zero), the multiplying factor $\eta(f)$ mentioned earlier is in general given by:

$$\eta(f) = \frac{hf/k_\text{B} T}{e^{hf/k_\text{B} T} - 1}+\frac{1}{2}
\frac{h f}{k_\text{B} T} \, .$$

At very high frequencies ($f \gtrsim \tfrac{k_\text{B} T}{h}$), the spectral density $S_{v_n v_n}(f)$ now starts to exponentially decrease to zero. At room temperature this transition occurs in the terahertz, far beyond the capabilities of conventional electronics, and so it is valid to set $\eta(f)=1$ for conventional electronics work.

==== Relation to Planck's law ====
Nyquist's formula is essentially the same as that derived by Planck in 1901 for electromagnetic radiation of a blackbody in one dimension—i.e., it is the one-dimensional version of Planck's law of blackbody radiation. In other words, a hot resistor will create electromagnetic waves on a transmission line just as a hot object will create electromagnetic waves in free space.

In 1946, Robert H. Dicke elaborated on the relationship, and further connected it to properties of antennas, particularly the fact that the average antenna aperture over all different directions cannot be larger than $\tfrac{\lambda^2}{4\pi}$, where λ is wavelength. This comes from the different frequency dependence of 3D versus 1D Planck's law.

=== Multiport electrical networks ===
Richard Q. Twiss extended Nyquist's formulas to multi-port passive electrical networks, including non-reciprocal devices such as circulators and isolators. Thermal noise appears at every port, and can be described as random series voltage sources in series with each port. The random voltages at different ports may be correlated, and their amplitudes and correlations are fully described by a set of cross-spectral density functions relating the different noise voltages,

$$S_{v_m v_n}(f) = 2 k_\text{B} T \eta(f) (Z_{mn}(f) + Z_{nm}(f)^*)$$

where the $Z_{mn}$ are the elements of the impedance matrix $\mathbf{Z}$. Again, an alternative description of the noise is instead in terms of parallel current sources applied at each port. Their cross-spectral density is given by

$$S_{i_m i_n}(f) = 2 k_\text{B} T \eta(f) (Y_{mn}(f) + Y_{nm}(f)^*)$$

where $\mathbf{Y} = \mathbf{Z}^{-1}$ is the admittance matrix.

== See also ==
- Fluctuation-dissipation theorem
- Shot noise
- Pink noise
- Langevin equation
- Rise over thermal
