= Kubo formula =

Quantum mechanics mathematical equation

The Kubo formula, named for Ryogo Kubo who first presented the formula in 1957, is an equation which expresses the linear response of an observable quantity due to a time-dependent perturbation.

Among numerous applications of the Kubo formula, one can calculate the charge and spin susceptibilities of systems of electrons in response to applied electric and magnetic fields. Responses to external mechanical forces and vibrations can be calculated as well.

== General Kubo formula ==
Consider a quantum system described by the (time independent) Hamiltonian $H_0$. The expectation value of a physical quantity at equilibrium temperature $T$, described by the operator $\hat{A}$, can be evaluated as:

$$\left\langle\hat{A}\right\rangle = {1 \over Z_0}\operatorname{Tr}\,\left[\hat{\rho}_0\hat{A}\right] = {1 \over Z_0}\sum_n \left\langle n \left| \hat{A} \right| n \right\rangle e^{-\beta E_n}$$,

where $\beta=1/k_{\rm B}T$ is the thermodynamic beta, $\hat{\rho}_0$ is density operator, given by

$$\hat{\rho}_0 = e^{-\beta \hat{H}_0} = \sum_n | n \rangle\langle n | e^{-\beta E_n}$$

and $Z_0 = \operatorname{Tr}\,\left[\hat\rho_0\right]$ is the partition function.

Suppose now that just after some time $t = t_0$ an external perturbation is applied to the system. The perturbation is described by an additional time dependence in the Hamiltonian:

$$\hat{H}(t) = \hat{H}_0 + \hat{V}(t) \theta (t - t_0),$$

where $\theta (t)$ is the Heaviside function (1 for positive times, 0 otherwise) and $\hat V(t)$ is hermitian and defined for all t, so that $\hat H(t)$ has for positive $t - t_0$ again a complete set of real eigenvalues $E_n(t).$ But these eigenvalues may change with time.

However, one can again find the time evolution of the density matrix $\hat{\rho}(t)$ rsp. of the partition function $Z(t) = \operatorname{Tr}\, \left[\hat\rho (t)\right],$ to evaluate the expectation value of

$$\left\langle\hat A\right\rangle = \frac{\operatorname{Tr}\,\left[\hat \rho (t)\,\hat A\right]}{\operatorname{Tr}\,\left[\hat\rho (t)\right]}.$$

The time dependence of the states $|n(t) \rangle$ is governed by the Schrödinger equation

$$i\hbar\frac{\partial}{\partial t} | n(t) \rangle = \hat{H}(t)| n(t) \rangle ,$$

which thus determines everything, corresponding of course to the Schrödinger picture. But since $\hat{V}(t)$ is to be regarded as a small perturbation, it is convenient to now use instead the interaction picture representation, $\left|\hat n(t) \right\rangle ,$ in lowest nontrivial order. The time dependence in this representation is given by $| n(t) \rangle = e^{-i\hat H_0t/\hbar} \left| \hat{n}(t) \right\rangle = e^{-i\hat H_0t/\hbar}\hat{U}(t, t_0) \left| \hat{n}(t_0) \right\rangle ,$ where by definition for all t and $t_0$ it is: $\left| \hat{n}(t_0) \right\rangle = e^{i\hat H_0t_0/\hbar} | n(t_0) \rangle$

To linear order in $\hat{V}(t)$, we have

$$\hat{U}(t, t_0) = 1 - \frac{i}{\hbar}\int_{t_0}^t dt' \hat{V}\mathord\left(t'\right)$$.

Thus one obtains the expectation value of $\hat{A}(t)$ up to linear order in the perturbation:

$$\left\langle\hat{A}(t)\right\rangle= \left\langle \hat{A} \right\rangle_0 - \frac{i}{\hbar}\int_{t_0}^t dt' {1 \over Z_0}\sum_n e^{-\beta E_n} \left\langle n (t_0) \left| \hat{A}(t) \hat{V}\mathord\left(t'\right) - \hat{V}\mathord\left(t'\right)\hat{A}(t) \right| n(t_0) \right\rangle$$,

thus

Kubo formula (general)

$\langle \hat A(t) \rangle=\left\langle \hat{A} \right\rangle_0 - \frac{i}{\hbar}\int_{t_0}^t dt' \left\langle \left[\hat{A}(t), \hat{V}\mathord\left(t'\right)\right]\right\rangle_0$

The brackets $\langle \rangle_0$ mean an equilibrium average with respect to the Hamiltonian $H_0 .$ Therefore, although the result is of first order in the perturbation, it involves only the zeroth-order eigenfunctions, which is usually the case in perturbation theory and moves away all complications which otherwise might arise for $t > t_0$.

The above expression is true for any kind of operators. (see also Second quantization)

=== Full Derivation of the Kubo formula ===
An alternative derivation of the Kubo formula begins with the time-dependent Schrödinger equation for a pure state,

$$i\hbar\frac{\partial}{\partial t}|\psi(t)\rangle
=
\hat H(t)|\psi(t)\rangle.$$

Define the unitary time-evolution operator by

$$\hat U(t,t_0)|\psi(t_0)\rangle=|\psi(t)\rangle,
\qquad
\hat U(t_0,t_0)=\hat I.$$

The Schrödinger equation then implies

$$i\hbar\frac{\partial\hat U(t,t_0)}{\partial t}
=
\hat H(t)\hat U(t,t_0).$$

For the time-independent unperturbed Hamiltonian $\hat H_0$, define

$$\hat U_0(t)=e^{-it\hat H_0/\hbar}.$$

Suppose that the complete Hamiltonian is

$$\hat H(t)=\hat H_0-F(t)\hat A,$$

where $F(t)$ is a real-valued generalized force and $\hat A$ is a Hermitian operator. Introduce the interaction picture by writing

$$\hat U(t,t_0)
=
\hat U_0(t)\hat U_I(t,t_0)\hat U_0^\dagger(t_0).$$

The factor $\hat U_0^\dagger(t_0)$ ensures that $\hat U(t_0,t_0)=\hat I$ when $\hat U_I(t_0,t_0)=\hat I$. Substitution into the evolution equation gives

$$\begin{aligned}
&i\hbar\frac{\partial\hat U_0(t)}{\partial t}
\hat U_I(t,t_0)\hat U_0^\dagger(t_0)
+i\hbar\hat U_0(t)
\frac{\partial\hat U_I(t,t_0)}{\partial t}
\hat U_0^\dagger(t_0)\\
&\qquad =
\left[\hat H_0-F(t)\hat A\right]
\hat U_0(t)\hat U_I(t,t_0)\hat U_0^\dagger(t_0).
\end{aligned}$$

Since

$$i\hbar\frac{\partial\hat U_0(t)}{\partial t}
=
\hat H_0\hat U_0(t),$$

the terms containing $\hat H_0$ cancel. Multiplying from the left by $\hat U_0^\dagger(t)$ and from the right by $\hat U_0(t_0)$ gives

$$i\hbar\frac{\partial\hat U_I(t,t_0)}{\partial t}
=
-F(t)\hat U_0^\dagger(t)\hat A\hat U_0(t)
\hat U_I(t,t_0).$$

Define the unperturbed time-dependent operator

$$\hat A_I(t)
=
\hat U_0^\dagger(t)\hat A\hat U_0(t)
=
e^{it\hat H_0/\hbar}\hat A e^{-it\hat H_0/\hbar}.$$

The interaction-picture evolution equation is therefore

$$i\hbar\frac{\partial\hat U_I(t,t_0)}{\partial t}
=
-F(t)\hat A_I(t)\hat U_I(t,t_0),$$

or equivalently,

$$\frac{\partial\hat U_I(t,t_0)}{\partial t}
=
-\frac{1}{i\hbar}
F(t)\hat A_I(t)\hat U_I(t,t_0).$$

Integrating from $t_0$ to $t$ gives

$$\hat U_I(t,t_0)-\hat U_I(t_0,t_0)
=
-\frac{1}{i\hbar}
\int_{t_0}^{t}\mathrm dt'\,
F(t')\hat A_I(t')\hat U_I(t',t_0).$$

Using the boundary condition

$$\hat U_I(t_0,t_0)=\hat I,$$

one obtains the exact integral equation

$$\hat U_I(t,t_0)
=
\hat I-\frac{1}{i\hbar}
\int_{t_0}^{t}\mathrm dt'\,
F(t')\hat A_I(t')\hat U_I(t',t_0).$$

This equation is iterative because the unknown evolution operator also appears inside the integral. For a sufficiently weak perturbation, linear response is obtained by replacing $\hat U_I(t',t_0)$ inside the integral by $\hat I$. To first order in $F$,

$$\hat U_I(t,t_0)
=
\hat I-\frac{1}{i\hbar}
\int_{t_0}^{t}\mathrm dt'\,
F(t')\hat A_I(t')
+\mathcal O(F^2).$$

This is the first-order term of the Dyson series. Its adjoint is

$$\hat U_I^\dagger(t,t_0)
=
\hat I+\frac{1}{i\hbar}
\int_{t_0}^{t}\mathrm dt'\,
F(t')\hat A_I(t')
+\mathcal O(F^2).$$

For another observable $\hat B$, define its unperturbed time dependence by

$$\hat B_I(t)
=
\hat U_0^\dagger(t)\hat B\hat U_0(t).$$

Because the equilibrium density operator commutes with $\hat U_0(t_0)$, the outer free-evolution factors cancel inside the equilibrium trace. It is therefore sufficient to consider

$$\hat B_{\mathrm{tot}}(t)
=
\hat U_I^\dagger(t,t_0)
\hat B_I(t)
\hat U_I(t,t_0).$$

Substituting the first-order expressions for $\hat U_I$ and $\hat U_I^\dagger$ gives

$$\begin{aligned}
\hat B_{\mathrm{tot}}(t)
={}&
\left[
\hat I+\frac{1}{i\hbar}
\int_{t_0}^{t}\mathrm dt'\,
F(t')\hat A_I(t')
\right]
\hat B_I(t)\\
&\times
\left[
\hat I-\frac{1}{i\hbar}
\int_{t_0}^{t}\mathrm dt'\,
F(t')\hat A_I(t')
\right]
+\mathcal O(F^2).
\end{aligned}$$

Discarding terms of second and higher order yields

$$\hat B_{\mathrm{tot}}(t)
=
\hat B_I(t)
+\frac{1}{i\hbar}
\int_{t_0}^{t}\mathrm dt'\,
F(t')
\left[
\hat A_I(t'),\hat B_I(t)
\right]
+\mathcal O(F^2).$$

The equilibrium average is defined by

$$\langle\hat X\rangle_0
=
\frac{1}{Z_0}
\operatorname{Tr}\left(
e^{-\beta\hat H_0}\hat X
\right),
\qquad
Z_0=\operatorname{Tr}\left(e^{-\beta\hat H_0}\right).$$

Averaging the preceding equation gives

$$\left\langle\hat B_{\mathrm{tot}}(t)\right\rangle_0
=
\left\langle\hat B_I(t)\right\rangle_0
+\frac{1}{i\hbar}
\int_{t_0}^{t}\mathrm dt'\,
F(t')
\left\langle
\left[
\hat A_I(t'),\hat B_I(t)
\right]
\right\rangle_0
+\mathcal O(F^2).$$

Since the equilibrium density operator commutes with $\hat H_0$,

$$\left\langle\hat B_I(t)\right\rangle_0
=
\left\langle\hat B\right\rangle_0.$$

Equilibrium correlation functions are also invariant under a common translation of both time arguments:

$$\left\langle
\left[
\hat A_I(t'),\hat B_I(t)
\right]
\right\rangle_0
=
\left\langle
\left[
\hat A,\hat B_I(t-t')
\right]
\right\rangle_0.$$

Define the response function

$$\phi_{AB}(t)
=
\frac{1}{i\hbar}
\left\langle
\left[
\hat A,\hat B_I(t)
\right]
\right\rangle_0.$$

It follows that

$$\phi_{AB}(t-t')
=
\frac{1}{i\hbar}
\left\langle
\left[
\hat A_I(t'),\hat B_I(t)
\right]
\right\rangle_0.$$

Taking $t_0\rightarrow-\infty$, with the perturbation switched on adiabatically, and writing $\langle\hat B(t)\rangle =\langle\hat B_{\mathrm{tot}}(t)\rangle_0$, gives the Kubo formula

$$\left\langle\hat B(t)\right\rangle
=
\left\langle\hat B\right\rangle_0
+
\int_{-\infty}^{t}\mathrm dt'\,
F(t')\phi_{AB}(t-t').$$

Equivalently, the linear response Green's function can be defined as

$$G_{AB}(t)
=
\phi_{AB}(t)\theta(t).$$

The response can then be written as a convolution over all times,

$$\delta\left\langle\hat B(t)\right\rangle
=
\int_{-\infty}^{\infty}\mathrm dt'\,
F(t')G_{AB}(t-t').$$

The Heaviside function ensures causality: the response at time $t$ depends only on values of the perturbation at earlier times.

== See also ==
- Green–Kubo relations
