= Ultrasonic grating =

Diffraction grating produced by interfering ultrasonic waves

An ultrasonic grating is a type of diffraction grating produced by the interference of ultrasonic waves in a medium, which alters the physical properties of the medium (and hence the refractive index) in a grid-like pattern. The term acoustic grating is a more general term that includes operation at audible frequencies.

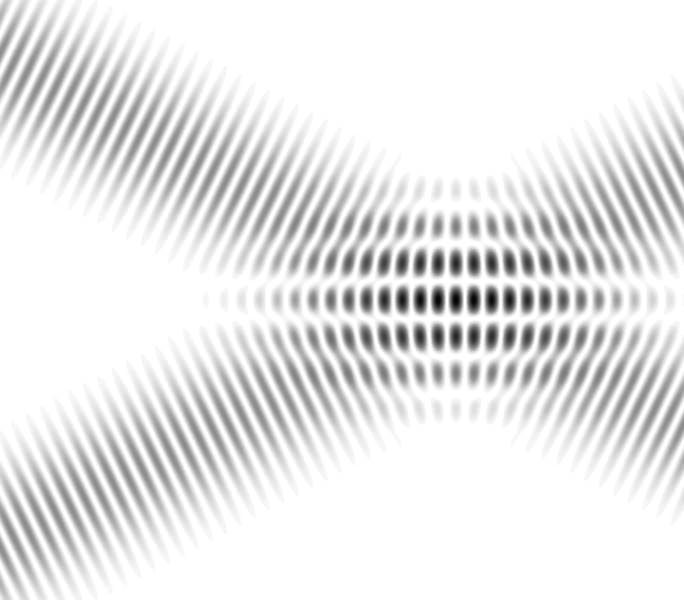
Interfering plane waves creating an interference grating

An ultrasonic wave is a sound wave at a frequency greater than 20 kHz. The human ear cannot recognize ultrasonic waves, but animals such as bats and dogs can. Ultrasonic waves can be produced by the piezoelectric effect and magnetostriction.

== Mechanism ==
When ultrasonic waves are generated in a liquid in a rectangular vessel, the wave can be reflected from the walls of the vessel. These reflected waves are called echoes. The direct and reflected waves are superimposed, forming a standing wave. The density of the liquid at a node is more than the density at an antinode. Hence, the liquid acts as a diffraction grating to a parallel beam of light passed through the liquid at right angles to the wave.

The diffraction grating formed in this way is analogous to a conventional diffraction grating with lines ruled on a glass plate. The less dense antinodes refract light less and are analogous to the transmitting slits of a conventional grating. The denser nodes refract light more and are analogous to the opaque part of a conventional grating.

== Mathematics ==
The grating element is equal to the wavelength of the ultrasonic waves—denoted by $d$. If $\lambda$ is the wavelength of the light passed through the grating that is diffracted by an angle $\theta$, then the nth order of the maximum is given by:

$$d \sin \theta = n \lambda$$

or

$$d = n \lambda/\sin \theta$$

If $v$ is the velocity of the ultrasonic wave in the liquid we can calculate the velocity of the wave with:

$$v/\nu = n \lambda/\sin \theta$$

or,

$$v = \nu n \lambda/\sin \theta$$

where $\nu$ is the frequency of the wave.

== Debye–Sears method ==
The Debye–Sears method determines the wavelength of monochromatic light using an acoustic or ultrasonic gratings. This method utilises the concept of piezoelectricity to obtain a grating.

The phenomenon of diffraction of light using an ultrasonic grating was first observed by Debye and Sears in 1932. When ultrasonic waves are propagated in a liquid, the density varies from layer to layer due to periodic variation of pressure. This grating can determine the wavelength of monochromatic light and the speed of waves.

If $\lambda\,\!$ is the wavelength of a monochromatic light source, and $\lambda_c\,\!$ is the wavelength of the ultrasonic waves, then applying the principle of diffraction, we get

$$\lambda_c\sin\theta = n\lambda\,\!$$

Where $\theta\,\!$ is the angle of diffraction.

Thus we can calculate either $\lambda\,\!$ or $\lambda_c\,\!$ if the other is known. We need not worry about the grating element since the nodes themselves act as slits, hence the distance between two slits are equal to the ultrasonic wave wavelength.

This method determines the velocity of ultrasonic waves using monochromatic sources like sodium vapour lamps. The medium is usually a piezoelectric crystal such as quartz, tourmaline, or Rochelle salt. A mechanical stress is produced along an axis of the crystal using an RF oscillator. By adjusting the frequency of the oscillator, we can determine the velocity $v_c\,\!$ of the ultrasonic waves by using

$$v_c = \eta \lambda_c\,\!$$

where $\eta\,\!$ is the frequency of the oscillator.

== See also ==
- Acousto-optics
- Acousto-optic modulator
- Acousto-optic deflector
- Acousto-optical spectrometer
- Nonlinear optics
