= Hugh Young =

Hugh Young may refer to:

- Hugh H. Young (1870–1945), American doctor
- Hugh Andrew Young (1898–1982), Canadian military officer and politician
- H. Edwin Young, American educator and Chancellor of UW-Madison
- Hugh D. Young (1930-2013), American physicist
