= Acousto-optics =

Study of interactions between sound and light

Acousto-optics is a branch of physics that studies the interactions between sound waves and light waves, especially the diffraction of laser light by ultrasound (or sound in general) through an ultrasonic grating.

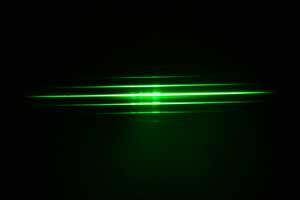
A diffraction image showing the acousto-optic effect.

== Introduction ==
In general, acousto-optic effects are based on the change of the refractive index of a medium due to the presence of sound waves in that medium. Sound waves produce a refractive index grating in the material, and it is this grating that is "seen" by the light wave. These variations in the refractive index, due to the pressure fluctuations, may be detected optically by refraction, diffraction, and interference effects; reflection may also be used.

The acousto-optic effect is extensively used in the measurement and study of ultrasonic waves. However, the growing principal area of interest is in acousto-optical devices for the deflection, modulation, signal processing and frequency shifting of light beams. This is due to the increasing availability and performance of lasers, which have made the acousto-optic effect easier to observe and measure. Technical progress in both crystal growth and high frequency piezoelectric transducers has brought valuable benefits to acousto-optic components' improvements.

Along with the current applications, acousto-optics presents interesting possible application. It can be used in nondestructive testing, structural health monitoring and biomedical applications, where optically generated and optical measurements of ultrasound gives a non-contact method of imaging.

== History ==
Optics has had a very long and full history, from ancient Greece, through the renaissance and modern times. As with optics, acoustics has a history of similar duration, again starting with the ancient Greeks. In contrast, the acousto-optic effect has had a relatively short history, beginning with Brillouin predicting the diffraction of light by an acoustic wave, being propagated in a medium of interaction, in 1922. This was then confirmed with experimentation in 1932 by Debye and Sears, and also by Lucas and Biquard.

The particular case of diffraction on the first order, under a certain angle of incidence, (also predicted by Brillouin), has been observed by Rytow in 1935. Raman and Nath (1937) have designed a general ideal model of interaction taking into account several orders. This model was developed by Phariseau (1956) for diffraction including only one diffraction order.

== Acousto-optic effect ==
The acousto-optic effect is a specific case of photoelasticity, where there is a change of a material's permittivity, $\varepsilon$, due to a mechanical strain $a$. Photoelasticity is the variation of the optical indicatrix coefficients $B_i$ caused by the strain $a_j$ given by,

$$(1) \ \Delta B_i = p_{ij} a_j, \,$$

where $p_{ij}$ is the photoelastic tensor with components, $i$,$j$ = 1,2,...,6.

Specifically in the acousto-optic effect, the strains $a_j$ are a result of the acoustic wave which has been excited within a transparent medium. This then gives rise to the variation of the refractive index. For a plane acoustic wave propagating along the z axis, the change in the refractive index can be expressed as

$$(2) \ n(z,t)=n_0+\Delta n \cos (\Omega t - Kz), \,$$

where $n_0$ is the undisturbed refractive index, $\Omega$ is the angular frequency, $K$ is the wavenumber of the acoustic wave, and $\Delta n$ is the amplitude of variation in the refractive index generated by the acoustic wave, and is given as,

$$(3) \ \Delta n = - \frac{1}{2} \sum_j n_0^3p_{zj} a_j,$$

The generated refractive index, (2), gives a diffraction grating moving with the velocity given by the speed of the sound wave in the medium. Light which then passes through the transparent material, is diffracted due to this generated refraction index, forming a prominent diffraction pattern. This diffraction pattern corresponds with a conventional diffraction grating at angles $\theta_n$ from the original direction, and is given by,

$$(4) \ \Lambda \sin (\theta_m) = m\lambda,\,$$

where $\lambda$ is the wavelength of the optical wave, $\Lambda$ is the wavelength of the acoustic wave and $m$ is the integer order maximum.

Light diffracted by an acoustic wave of a single frequency produces two distinct diffraction types. These are Raman–Nath diffraction and Bragg diffraction.

Raman–Nath diffraction is observed with relatively low acoustic frequencies, typically less than 10 MHz, and with a small acousto-optic interaction length, ℓ, which is typically less than 1 cm. This type of diffraction occurs at an arbitrary angle of incidence, $\theta_0$.

In contrast, Bragg diffraction occurs at higher acoustic frequencies, usually exceeding 100 MHz. The observed diffraction pattern generally consists of two diffraction maxima; these are the zeroth and the first orders. However, even these two maxima only appear at definite incidence angles close to the Bragg angle, $\theta_B$. The first order maximum or the Bragg maximum is formed due to a selective reflection of the light from the wave fronts of ultrasonic wave. The Bragg angle is given by the expression,

$$(5) \ \sin \theta_B = - \frac{\lambda f}{2 n_i \nu}\left[ 1+\frac{\nu^2}{\lambda^2 f^2 } \left( n_i^2 - n_d^2 \right) \right],$$

where $\lambda$ is the wavelength of the incident light wave (in a vacuum), $f$ is the acoustic frequency, $v$ is the velocity of the acoustic wave, $n_i$ is the refractive index for the incident optical wave, and $n_d$ is the refractive index for the diffracted optical waves.

In general, there is no point at which Bragg diffraction takes over from Raman–Nath diffraction. It is simply a fact that as the acoustic frequency increases, the number of observed maxima is gradually reduced due to the angular selectivity of the acousto-optic interaction. Traditionally, the type of diffraction, Bragg or Raman–Nath, is determined by the conditions $Q \gg 1$ and $Q \ll 1$ respectively, where Q is given by,

$$(6) \ Q = \frac{2\pi\lambda \ell f^2}{n \nu^2},$$

which is known as the Klein–Cook parameter. Since, in general, only the first order diffraction maximum is used in acousto-optic devices, Bragg diffraction is preferable due to the lower optical losses. However, the acousto-optic requirements for Bragg diffraction limit the frequency range of acousto-optic interaction. As a consequence, the speed of operation of acousto-optic devices is also limited.

== Acousto-optic devices ==
=== Acousto-optic modulator ===
An acousto-optic modulator

By varying the parameters of the acoustic wave, including the amplitude, phase, frequency and polarization, properties of the optical wave may be modulated. The acousto-optic interaction also makes it possible to modulate the optical beam by both temporal and spatial modulation.

A simple method of modulating the optical beam travelling through the acousto-optic device is done by switching the acoustic field on and off. When off the light beam is undiverted, the intensity of light directed at the Bragg diffraction angle is zero. When switched on and Bragg diffraction occurs, the intensity at the Bragg angle increases. So the acousto-optic device is modulating the output along the Bragg diffraction angle, switching it on and off. The device is operated as a modulator by keeping the acoustic wavelength (frequency) fixed and varying the drive power to vary the amount of light in the deflected beam.

There are several limitations associated with the design and performance of acousto-optic modulators. The acousto-optic medium must be designed carefully to provide maximum light intensity in a single diffracted beam. The time taken for the acoustic wave to travel across the diameter of the light beam gives a limitation on the switching speed, and hence limits the modulation bandwidth. The finite velocity of the acoustic wave means the light cannot be fully switched on or off until the acoustic wave has traveled across the light beam. So to increase the bandwidth the light must be focused to a small diameter at the location of the acousto-optic interaction. This minimum focused size of the beam represents the limit for the bandwidth.

=== Acousto-optic tunable filter ===
The principle behind the operation of acousto-optic tunable filters is based on the wavelength of the diffracted light being dependent on the acoustic frequency. By tuning the frequency of the acoustic wave, the desired wavelength of the optical wave can be diffracted acousto-optically.

There are two major types of the acousto-optic filters, the collinear and non-collinear filters. The type of filter depends on the geometry of acousto-optic interaction. In addition to these traditional configurations, a close-to-collinear (or quasi-collinear) geometry has been developed, which offers advantages such as extended interaction length and improved spectral resolution compared to standard configurations. Nevertheless, a specific input polarization is typically required for a correct performance.

The polarization of the incident light can be either ordinary or extraordinary. For the definition, we assume ordinary polarization. Here the following list of symbols is used,

$\alpha$: the angle between the acoustic wave vector and the crystallographic axis z of the crystal;

$\gamma$: the wedge angle between the input and output faces of the filter cell (the wedge angle is necessary for eliminating the angular shift of the diffracted beam caused by frequency changing);

$\varphi$: the angle between the incident light wave vector and [110] axis of the crystal;

$\alpha_\ell$: the angle between the input face of the cell and acoustic wave vector;

$\beta$: the angle between deflected and non-deflected light at the central frequency;

$\ell$: the transducer length.

The incidence angle $\varphi$ and the central frequency $f_i$ of the filter are defined by the following set of equations,

$$(7) \ n_\varphi = \frac{n_0 n_e}{\sqrt{n_0^2 \cos \varphi + n_e^2 \sin^2 \varphi}}$$

$$(8) \ f_i(\varphi)=\frac{\nu}{\lambda}\left[n_\varphi\cos(\varphi+\alpha)\pm\sqrt{n_0^2 - n_\varphi^2(\varphi)\sin^2(\varphi+\alpha)}\right]$$

Refractive indices of the ordinary ($n_0$) and extraordinary ($n_e$) polarized beams are determined by taking into account their dispersive dependence.

The sound velocity, $v$, depends on the angle α, such that,

$$(9) \ \nu (\alpha) = \nu_{110} \sqrt{\cos^2\alpha + \left(\frac{\nu_{001}}{\nu_{110}}\right)^2 \sin^2\alpha}$$

$v_{110}$ and $v_{001}$ are the sound velocities along the axes [110] and [001], consecutively. The value of $\alpha_1$ is determined by the angles $\varphi$ and $\alpha$,

$$(10) \ \alpha_\ell = \varphi + \alpha$$

The angle $\beta$ between the diffracted and non-diffracted beams defines the view field of the filter; it can be calculated from the formula,

$$(11) \ \beta = \arcsin \left( \frac{\lambda f_0}{n_0 \nu} \sin \alpha + \varphi \right)$$

Input light need not be polarized for a non-collinear design. Unpolarized input light is scattered into orthogonally polarized beams separated by the scattering angle for the particular design and wavelength. If the optical design provides an appropriate beam block for the unscattered light, then two beams (images) are formed in an optical passband that is nearly equivalent in both orthogonally linearly polarized output beams (differing by the Stokes and Anti-Stokes scattering parameter). Because of dispersion, these beams move slightly with scanning rf frequency.

=== Acousto-optic deflectors ===
An acousto-optic deflector spatially controls the optical beam. In the operation of an acousto-optic deflector the power driving the acoustic transducer is kept on, at a constant level, while the acoustic frequency is varied to deflect the beam to different angular positions. The acousto-optic deflector makes use of the acoustic frequency dependent diffraction angle, where a change in the angle $\Delta \theta_d$ as a function of the change in frequency $\Delta f$ is given as,

$$(12) \ \Delta \theta_d = \frac{\lambda}{\nu}\Delta f$$

where $\lambda$ is the optical wavelength of the beam and $\nu$ is the velocity of the acoustic wave.

AOD technology has made practical the Bose–Einstein condensation for which the 2001 Nobel Prize in Physics was awarded to Eric A. Cornell, Wolfgang Ketterle and Carl E. Wieman. Another application of acoustic-optical deflection is optical trapping of small molecules.

AODs are essentially the same as acousto-optic modulators (AOMs). In an AOM, only the amplitude of the sound wave is modulated (to modulate the intensity of the diffracted laser beam), whereas in an AOD, both the amplitude and frequency are adjusted, making the engineering requirements tighter for an AOD than an AOM.

== Materials ==
All materials display the acousto-optic effect. Fused silica is used as a standard to compare when measuring photoelastic coefficients. Lithium niobate is often used in high frequency devices. Softer materials, such as arsenic trisulfide, tellurium dioxide and tellurite glasses, lead silicate, Ge_{55}As_{12}S_{33}, mercury(I) chloride, lead(II) bromide, with slow acoustic waves make high efficiency devices at lower frequencies, and give high resolution.

== See also ==
- Acousto-optic modulator
- Acousto-optic deflector
- Nonlinear optics
- Sonoluminescence
- Schaefer–Bergmann diffraction
