= Acousto-optical spectrometer =

An acousto-optical spectrometer (AOS) is based on the diffraction of light by ultrasonic waves. A piezoelectric transducer, driven by the RF signal (from the receiver), generates an acoustic wave in a crystal (the so-called Bragg-cell). This acoustic wave modulates the refractive index and induces a phase grating. The Bragg-cell is illuminated by a collimated laser beam. The angular dispersion of the diffracted light represents a true image of the IF-spectrum according to the amplitude and wavelengths of the acoustic waves in the crystal. The spectrum is detected by using a single linear diode array (CCD), which is placed in the focal plane of an imaging optics. Depending on the crystal and the focal length of the imaging optics, the resolution of this type of spectrometer can be varied.

== See also ==
- Acousto-optics
- Acousto-optic deflector
- Acousto-optic modulator
- Nonlinear optics
