= Hugh D. Young =

American physicist (1930–2013)

Hugh David Young
- Born: November 3, 1930; Ames, Iowa
- Died: August 20, 2013 (aged 82); Oakmont, Pennsylvania
- Citizenship: United States
- Education: Carnegie Institute of Technology
- Known for: University Physics
- Spouse: Alice Carroll
- Scientific career
- Fields: Physics
- Workplaces: Carnegie Mellon University

Hugh David Young (November 3, 1930 – August 20, 2013) was an American physicist who taught physics for 52 years at Carnegie Mellon University. Young is best known for co-authoring the later editions of University Physics, a highly regarded introductory physics textbook, with Francis Sears and Mark Zemansky. Hugh Young became a coauthor in 1973.

Young was born on November 3, 1930, in Ames, Iowa, and was raised in Mondamin and Osage, Iowa. He came to Carnegie Mellon as an undergraduate physics major in 1948, and, by 1959, had earned a Bachelor of Science, Master of Science, and PhD in Physics from the university. He later earned a Bachelor of Fine Arts in music in 1972, concentrating in organ performance.

Except for brief visiting professorships at the University of California, Berkeley, Young spent 60 years at Carnegie Mellon. He taught more than 18,000 students and attained international prominence as a leading author of physics textbooks, including books on the statistical treatment of data, laboratory techniques, fundamental topics in introductory physics, and a survey text, University Physics, on which his collaboration with Sears and Zemansky began in 1973. Now in its 15th edition, University Physics is among the most widely used introductory textbooks in the world. Young also wrote an algebra-based version named Sears and Zemansky's College Physics, which is currently in its 11th edition. In 2001, the Mellon College of Science's College Council approved the Hugh D. Young Graduate Student Teaching Award in his honor.

His honors included many of Carnegie Mellon University's highest awards: The William H. and Frances S. Ryan Award for Meritorious Teaching (1965), the Carnegie Mellon Alumni Service Award (1995); The Robert E. Doherty Award for Sustained Contributions to Excellence in Education (1997); the Mellon College of Science's Richard Moore Award (1998); the Andrew Carnegie Society Recognition Award (2007). His lectures were often standing room only and showed not only Young's brilliance, but also his sense of humor.

Young died at the age of 82 on August 20, 2013, in Oakmont, Pennsylvania.

== Books ==
- Hugh, Young; Roger Freedman (2019). Sears and Zemansky's University Physics (15th ed.). Pearson Education.
- Hugh, Young; Roger Freedman (2019). Sears and Zemansky's University Physics with Modern Physics (15th ed.). Pearson Education.
- Hugh, Young (2019). Sears and Zemansky's College Physics (11th ed.). Addison Wesley.
- Hugh, Young (1962). Statistical Treatment of Experimental Data. McGraw-Hill.
- Hugh, Young (1973). Fundamentals of Mechanics and Heat (2nd ed.). McGraw-Hill.
- Hugh, Young (1976). Fundamentals of Waves, Optics and Modern Physics (2nd ed.). McGraw-Hill. Bibcode:1976fwom.book.....Y.
