= University Physics =

Textbook by Francis Sears et al.

- 12th edition cover featuring the Millau Viaduct
- Author: Hugh Young, Roger Freedman, Francis Sears, Mark Zemansky
- Cover artist: Yvo Riezebos Design
- Language: English
- Subject: Physics
- Genre: Non-fiction
- Publisher: Pearson Education
- Publication date: 1949 (1st ed.); 2019 (15th ed.)
- Publication place: United States
- Media type: Print (hardback & paperback)
- Pages: 1608 (15th ed.)
- ISBN: 978-0-135-15955-2 (15th ed.)

University Physics, informally known as Sears & Zemansky, is a three-volume physics textbook written by Hugh Young and Roger Freedman. The first edition of University Physics was published by Mark Zemansky and Francis Sears in 1949. The textbook soon became well-known. Hugh Young became a coauthor with Sears and Zemansky in 1973. Now in its 16th edition, University Physics remains among the most widely used introductory textbooks in the world.

Volume One covers mechanics; waves and acoustics; and thermodynamics. Volume Two goes over electricity and magnetism; and optics. Volume Three gives an overview of topics in modern physics (special relativity, quantum mechanics, nuclear physics, particle physics, and cosmology).

== See also ==
- List of textbooks on classical mechanics and quantum mechanics
- List of textbooks in electromagnetism
- List of textbooks in thermodynamics and statistical mechanics
- List of books on general relativity
