= Rigid line inclusion =

Mathematical model used in solid mechanics

A rigid line inclusion, also called stiffener, is a mathematical model used in solid mechanics to describe a narrow hard phase, dispersed within a matrix material. This inclusion is idealised as an infinitely rigid and thin reinforcement, so that it represents a sort of ‘inverse’ crack, from which the nomenclature ‘anticrack’ derives.

From the mechanical point of view, a stiffener introduces a kinematical constraint, imposing that it may only suffer a rigid body motion along its line.

== Theoretical model ==
The stiffener model has been used to investigate different mechanical problems in classical elasticity (load diffusion, inclusion at bi material interface).

Sketch of a stiffener embedded in a matrix loaded at its boundary.

The main characteristics of the theoretical solutions are basically the following.

1. Similarly to a fracture, a square-root singularity in the stress/strain fields is present at the tip of the inclusion.
2. In a homogeneous matrix subject to uniform stress at infinity, such singularity only arises when a normal stress acts parallel or orthogonal to the inclusion line, while a stiffener parallel to a simple shear does not disturb the ambient field.

== Experimental validation ==
Dog-bone shaped sample of two-component epoxy resin containing a lamellar (aluminum) inclusion.

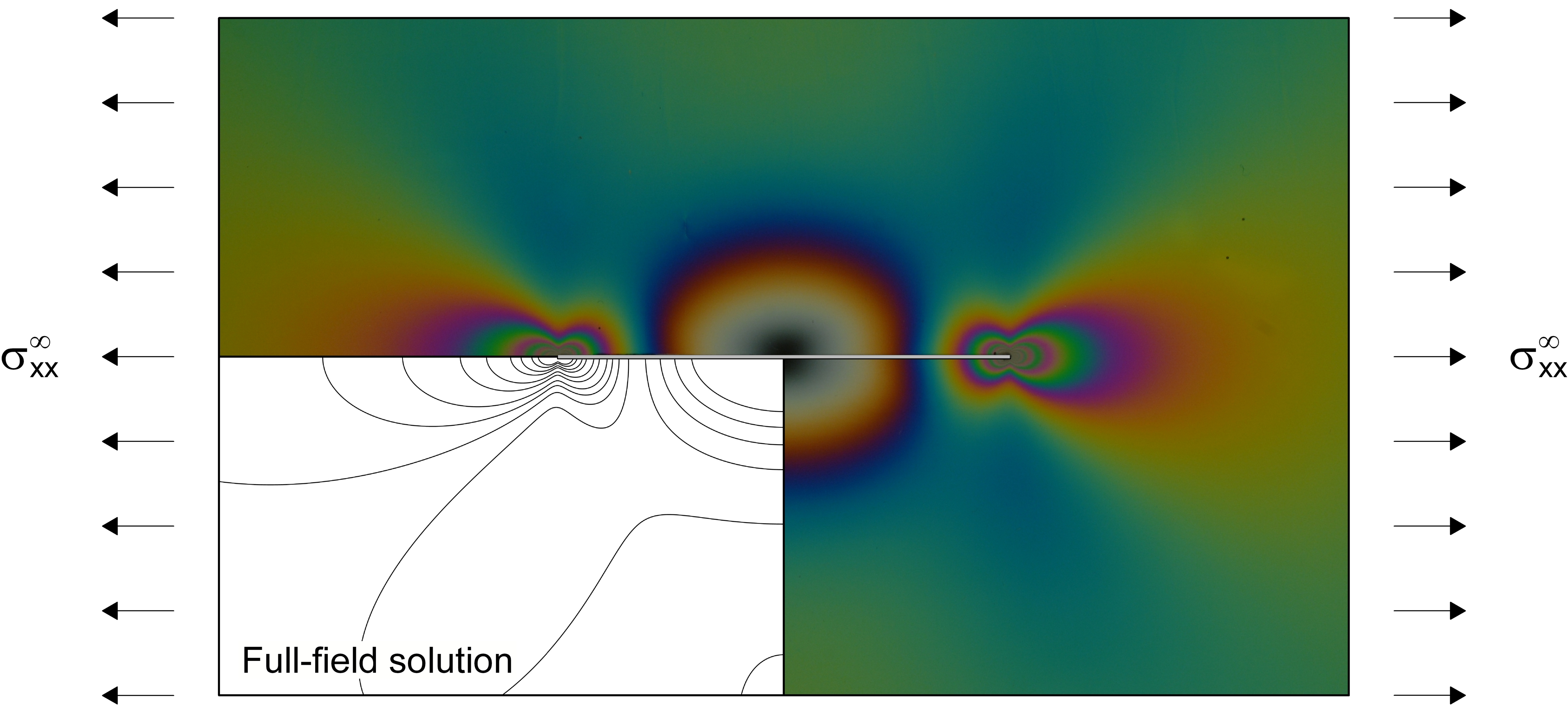
Photoelastic experiment to validate the rigid line inclusion model. Isochromatic fringe patterns around a steel platelet in a photo-elastic two-part epoxy resin compared to analytical solution obtained in plane-strain classical elasticity. Normal stress parallel to the inclusion line is applied.

The characteristics of the elastic solution have been experimentally confirmed through photoelastic transmission experiments.

== Interaction of rigid line inclusions ==
The interaction of rigid line inclusions in parallel, collinear and radial configurations have been studied using the boundary element method (BEM) and validated using photoelasticity.

== Shear bands emerging at the stiffener tip ==
Analytical solutions obtained in prestressed elasticity show the possibility of the emergence of shear bands at the tip of the stiffener.
