= Francis Sears =

American physicist (1898–1975)

Francis Weston Sears
- Born: October 1, 1898; Plymouth, Massachusetts
- Died: November 12, 1975 (aged 77); Hanover, New Hampshire
- Citizenship: United States
- Education: MIT
- Known for: University Physics; Debye–Sears effect
- Spouse: Mildred Cornwall
- Scientific career
- Fields: Acousto-optics; Physics education
- Workplaces: MIT; Dartmouth College

Francis Weston Sears (October 1, 1898 – November 12, 1975) was an American physicist and instructor who was authored multiple textbooks in physics. He is best known for co-authoring University Physics, an introductory physics textbook, with Mark Zemansky. The book—colloquially known as "Sears and Zemansky"—was first published in 1949. Hugh Young became a coauthor in 1973.

Sears was born on October 1, 1898, in Plymouth, Massachusetts, and attended public schools there. He earned his bachelor's degree from the Massachusetts Institute of Technology (MIT) in 1921 and his master's degree from the same school in 1924. He taught physics at MIT for three decades before moving to Dartmouth College in 1956. At Dartmouth, Sears was the Appleton Professor of Physics.

In 1932 he collaborated with Peter Debye, who was then visiting MIT, in the discovery of what is now called the Debye–Sears effect, the diffraction of light by ultrasonic waves in a liquid. The following year he became a member of the Optical Society of America.

During the middle 1940s, Sears conceived of a series of textbooks for the first two years of collegiate physics, in which calculus was used sparingly during the first year, then more frequently during the second. His Principles of Physics (1948) was printed by Addison-Wesley, then a small publisher in Cambridge, Massachusetts. He was active in the American Association of Physics Teachers (AAPT), serving as its treasurer from 1950 to 1958, followed by successive one-year terms as president-elect and president. In 1961, the AAPT awarded him with the Oersted Medal in recognition of his skill as a teacher of physics.

He retired to Norwich, Vermont and died in Hanover, New Hampshire, of a stroke on November 12, 1975. He was 77 years old. The third, and last, edition of his Thermodynamics, Kinetic Theory, and Statistical Thermodynamics, written with Gerhard L. Salinger, appeared just a few months before his death. It proved to be popular among undergraduates majoring in physics even though it was originally intended for students in electrical engineering.

== Books ==
- Sears, Francis W. (1935). An Introduction to Optics. Cambridge, Massachusetts: MIT Press.
- Sears, Francis W. (1946). Electricity and Magnetism. Reading, Massachusetts. Addison-Wesley.
- Sears, Francis; Mark Zemansky; et al. (1948). College Physics (1st ed.). Addison Wesley.
- Sears, Francis W. (1949). Optics (3rd ed.). Principles of Physics Series. Addison-Wesley.
- Sears, Francis W. (1950). An Introduction to Thermodynamics, the Kinetic Theory of Gases and Statistical Mechanics. Addison Wesley. 2nd edition, 1953.
- Sears, Francis W. (1950). Mechanics, heat and sound. Cambridge, Massachusetts. Addison Wesley.
- Sears, Francis (1958). Mechanics, Wave Motion, and Heat (1st ed.). Addison Wesley.
- Francis W. Sears (1975). Thermodynamics, Kinetic Theory, and Statistical Thermodynamics. Addison Wesley. ISBN 020106894X.

== See also ==
- MIT Physics Department
