= Schaefer–Bergmann diffraction =

Diffraction of light with sound

Schaefer–Bergmann diffraction is the resulting diffraction pattern of light interacting with sound waves in transparent crystals or glasses.

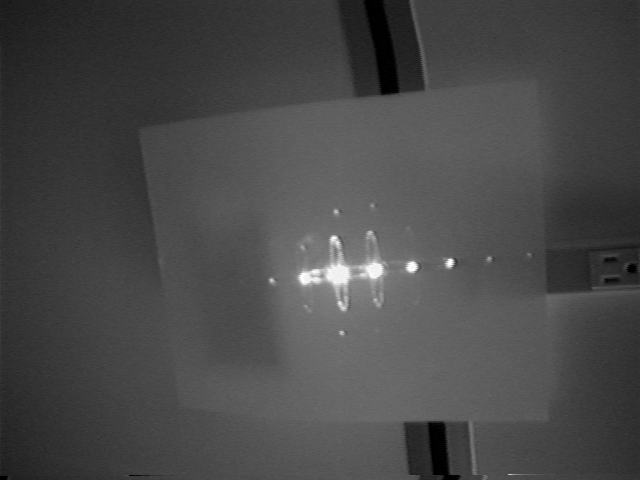
Picture of Schaefer–Bergmann diffraction: He–Ne laser through tellurium dioxide AOD. Image also available on Figshare.
