= Acousto-optic modulator =

Device which diffracts light via sound waves

An acousto-optic modulator consists of a piezoelectric transducer which creates sound waves in a material like glass or quartz. A light beam is diffracted into several orders. By vibrating the material with a pure sinusoid and tilting the AOM so the light is reflected from the flat sound waves into the first diffraction order, up to 90% deflection efficiency can be achieved.

An acousto-optic modulator (AOM), also called a Bragg cell or an acousto-optic deflector (AOD), uses the acousto-optic effect to diffract and shift the frequency of light using sound waves (usually at radio-frequency). They are used in lasers for Q-switching, telecommunications for signal modulation, and in spectroscopy for frequency control. A piezoelectric transducer is attached to a material such as glass. An oscillating electric signal drives the transducer to vibrate, which creates sound waves in the material. These can be thought of as moving periodic planes of expansion and compression that change the index of refraction. Incoming light scatters (see Brillouin scattering) off the resulting periodic index modulation and interference occurs similar to Bragg diffraction. The interaction can be thought of as a three-wave mixing process resulting in sum-frequency generation or difference-frequency generation between phonons and photons.

== Principles of operation ==
A typical AOM operates under Bragg condition, where the incident light comes at Bragg angle $\theta_B\approx \sin \theta_B = \tfrac{\lambda}{2\Lambda}$ from the perpendicular of the sound wave's propagation.

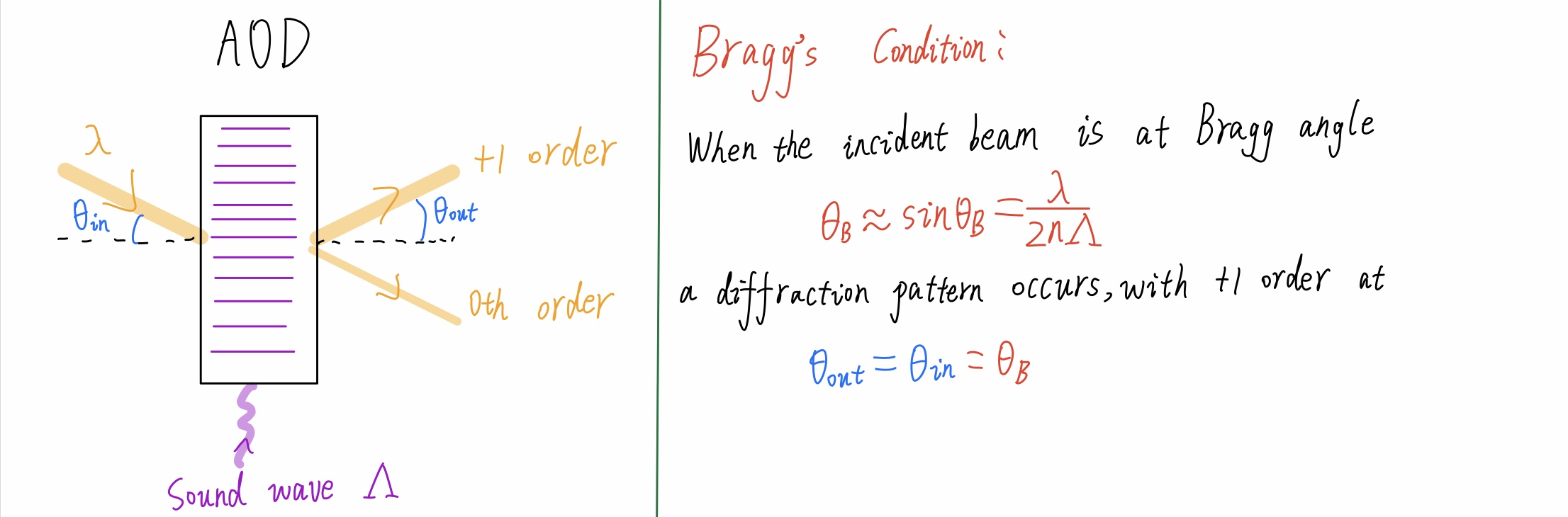
A sketch to explain the Bragg condition for an AOD. Λ is the wavelength of the sound wave, λ is that of the light wave, and n is the refractive index of the crystal in the AOD (which should be omitted. This is a mistake). The +1 order has a positive frequency shift compared to the incident light; The 0th order has the same frequency as the incident light. The minor transverse displacement of 0th order from the incident light represents the refraction inside the crystal.

=== Diffraction ===
When the incident light beam is at Bragg angle, a diffraction pattern emerges where an order of diffracted beam occurs at each angle θ that satisfies:

$$2\Lambda\sin\theta = m \lambda$$

Here, m = ..., −2, −1, 0, +1, +2, ... is the order of diffraction, λ is the wavelength of light in vacuum, and Λ is the wavelength of the sound. Note that m = 0 order travels in the same direction as the incident beam.

Diffraction from a sinusoidal modulation in a thin crystal mostly results in the m = −1, 0, +1 diffraction orders. Cascaded diffraction in medium thickness crystals leads to higher orders of diffraction. In thick crystals with weak modulation, only phasematched orders are diffracted; this is called Bragg diffraction. The angular deflection can range from 1 to 5000 beam widths (the number of resolvable spots). Consequently, the deflection is typically limited to tens of milliradians.

The angular separation between adjacent orders for Bragg diffraction is twice the Bragg angle, i.e. $\Delta\theta \approx \tfrac{\lambda}{\Lambda}.$

=== Intensity ===
The amount of light diffracted by the sound wave depends on the intensity of the sound. Hence, the intensity of the sound can be used to modulate the intensity of the light in the diffracted beam. Typically, the intensity that is diffracted into m = 0 order can be varied between 15% and 99% of the input light intensity. Likewise, the intensity of the m = +1 order can be varied between 0% and 80%.

An expression of the efficiency in m = +1 order is:

$$\eta = \frac{I_1}{I} = \sin^2\frac{\Delta\phi}{2}$$

where the external phase excursion $\Delta\phi = \frac{\pi}{\lambda}\sqrt{2\frac{L}{H}M_2P}.$

To obtain the same efficiency for different wavelength, the RF power in the AOM has to be proportional to the square of the wavelength of the optical beam. Note that this formula also tells us that, when we start at a high RF power P, it might be higher than the first peak in the sine squared function, in which case as we increase P, we would settle at the second peak with a very high RF power, leading to overdriving the AOM and potential damage to the crystal or other components. To avoid this problem, one should always start with a very low RF power, and slowly increase it to settle at the first peak.

Note that there are two configurations that satisfies Bragg Condition: If the incident beam's wavevector's component on the sound wave's propagation direction goes against the sound wave, the Bragg diffraction/scattering process will result in the maximum efficiency into m = +1 order, which has a positive frequency shift; However, if the incident beam goes along the sound wave, the maximum diffraction efficiency into m = –1 order is achieved, which has a negative frequency shift.

=== Frequency ===
One difference from Bragg diffraction is that the light is scattering from moving planes. A consequence of this is the frequency of the diffracted beam f in order m will be Doppler-shifted by an amount equal to the frequency of the sound wave F.
$$f \rightarrow f + mF$$

This frequency shift can be also understood by the fact that energy and momentum (of the photons and phonons) are conserved in the scattering process. A typical frequency shift varies from 27 MHz, for a less-expensive AOM, to 1 GHz, for a state-of-the-art commercial device. In some AOMs, two acoustic waves travel in opposite directions in the material, creating a standing wave. In this case the spectrum of the diffracted beam contains multiple frequency shifts, in any case integer multiples of the frequency of the sound wave.

=== Phase ===
In addition, the phase of the diffracted beam will also be shifted by the phase of the sound wave. The phase can be changed by an arbitrary amount.

=== Polarization ===
Collinear transverse acoustic waves or perpendicular longitudinal waves can change the polarization. The acoustic waves induce a birefringent phase-shift, much like in a Pockels cell. The acousto-optic tunable filter, especially the dazzler, which can generate variable pulse shapes, is based on this principle.

== Mode-locking ==
Acousto-optic modulators are much faster than typical mechanical devices such as tiltable mirrors. The time it takes an AOM to shift the exiting beam in is roughly limited to the transit time of the sound wave across the beam (typically 5 to 100 ns). This is fast enough to create active modelocking in an ultrafast laser. When faster control is necessary electro-optic modulators are used. However, these require very high voltages (e.g. 1...10 kV), whereas AOMs offer more deflection range, simple design, and low power consumption (less than 3 W).

== Double-pass configuration ==
Since the beam diffraction angle is determined by the electrical signal frequency, alignment is an issue in laser spectroscopy experiments where frequency is swept. To eliminate this, an AOM can be operated in the double-pass configuration, which automatically compensates for beam angle deflections. In this configuration, the beam is sent first through the AOM, before undergoing a 90˚ polarization rotation (typically with a quarter-wave plate and a mirror), and then back through the AOM where it is deflected again by the crystal at the same angle. Finally, the returning light is split off using a polarizing beam splitter. In this configuration, the output frequency shift is twice the electrical drive frequency.

== Applications ==
- Q-switching
- Regenerative amplifiers
- Cavity dumping
- Modelocking
- Laser Doppler vibrometer
- Film scanner
- Confocal microscopy
- Synthetic array heterodyne detection
- Hyperspectral Imaging

== See also ==
- Acousto-optics
- Acousto-optic deflector
- Acousto-optical spectrometer
- Electro-optic modulator
- Jeffree cell
- Liquid crystal tunable filter
- Photoelasticity
- Pockels effect
