= Mark Zemansky =

American physicist (1900–1981)

Mark Waldo Zemansky
- Born: May 5, 1900; New York City
- Died: December 29, 1981 (aged 81); Teaneck, New Jersey
- Education: City College of New York (B.S. 1921); Columbia University (Ph.D. 1927)
- Known for: Heat and Thermodynamics (1937); University Physics (1949); Wu experiment (1956)
- Spouse: Adele
- Awards: Oersted Medal (1956)
- Scientific career
- Fields: Atomic physics; Low-temperature physics; Physics education
- Workplaces: City College of New York (1925-1967)
- Thesis: The Diffusion of Imprisoned Resonance Radiation In Mercury Vapor (1927)
- Doctoral advisor: Harold Worthington Webb
- Notable students: Jay Gregory Dash; Bernard T. Feld; Herman Feshbach, Herbert Goldstein; William W. Havens Jr.; Robert Herman; Robert Hofstadter; Leon M. Lederman; William Nierenberg; Arno Allan Penzias; Frank Press, Julian Schwinger; Gary Steigman; Leonard Susskind

Mark Waldo Zemansky (May 5, 1900 – December 29, 1981) was an American physicist and teacher. He was a professor of physics at the City College of New York for decades and is best known for co-authoring the introductory textbook titled University Physics with Francis Sears, first published in 1949 and has had many editions since.

== Early life ==
Zemansky grew up in Bensonhurst, Brooklyn where his mother, Bessie Cohen Zemansky (1868–1946), helped to found a Reform temple, and his father, Dr. Abraham Philip Zemansky (d. 1932), an 1874 graduate of the College of Physicians and Surgeons in the City of New York, was one of the first attending physicians at Lebanon Hospital located in The Bronx, New York (later merged as Bronx-Lebanon Hospital Center).

His twin brother, Abraham Philip Zemansky Jr. (Columbia University College of Physicians and Surgeons, '23), died in 1928 at age 28 of sepsis after a mastoid operation.

== Academic career ==
Zemansky graduated from City College of New York in 1921 and received a Ph.D. from Columbia University in 1927, under the supervision of Harold Worthington Webb (1884–1974). His doctoral dissertation, The Diffusion of Imprisoned Resonance Radiation In Mercury Vapor, was published in the journal Physical Review in 1927.

In 1925, he joined the faculty of City College of New York, where he stayed until his retirement in 1967. As chairman of the physics department from 1956 to 1959, he brought it into the modern era. From 1963 to 1966 he was the first executive officer of the City University's new doctoral program in physics.

Zemansky was a National Research Council fellow, at Princeton University from 1928 to 1930, then at the Kaiser Wilhelm Institute in Berlin, Germany from 1930 to 1931. During that time, he studied radiation and collision processes of gaseous atoms.

With Allan C. G. Mitchell, son of the astronomer Samuel Alfred Mitchell, Zemansky authored a seminal treatise titled Resonance Radiation and Excited Atoms (1934). This was Zemansky's first book. It was reprinted in 1961, following the invention of the laser (light amplification by stimulated emission of radiation) and discovery of the Mössbauer effect, which spurred interest in phenomena involving resonance.

He published his famous textbook, Heat and Thermodynamics, in 1937. Richard Dittmann became his co-author in subsequent editions. Key experimental results are described.

During the early 1940s, he helped scientists flee from Germany to the United States. One of them was Fritz Reiche, for whom he and Rudolf Ladenburg secured aid and an academic position.

From 1946 to 1956, he was associated with the Cryogenic Laboratory of Columbia University where he collaborated with Henry A. Boorse, an expert on low-temperature physics, on the measurement of heat capacities of superconducting metals and other researches. During this time he helped Chien-Shiung Wu conduct her groundbreaking experiment establishing the violation of parity conservation in weak interactions. The Wu experiment of 1956 was carried out at the low-temperature laboratories of the National Bureau of Standards. In the same year, he received the Oersted Medal from the American Association of Physics Teachers (AAPT).

In 1947, Zemansky and Francis Sears published the first edition of College Physics. Their University Physics followed in 1949, and has since become a popular textbook for new undergraduates. For some years, Zemansky also participated in the production of educational films for physics produced by McGraw-Hill.

He was active in the American Association of Physics Teachers and was its president in 1951 and its executive secretary from 1967 to 1970. He also served as the associate editor of the American Journal of Physics from 1941 to 1947.

== Personal life and death ==
Zemansky, his wife Adele, and their family resided in Teaneck, New Jersey, until the time of his death. They had two sons, Philip Zeman (1939–1979), and Herbert Zeman (b. 1944), a physicist and inventor of medical devices who graduated from Oberlin College in 1965 (A.B. Physics), then Stanford University in 1972 (M.S., Ph.D. Physics).

Zemansky died at his home in Teaneck, New Jersey on December 29, 1981. He was 81 years old.

== Selected books ==
- Mitchell, Allan C.G.; Zemansky, Mark (2009) [1934]. Resonance Radiation and Excited Atoms. Cambridge University Press. ISBN 978-0-521-11482-0.
- Zemansky, Mark W. (1937). Heat and Thermodynamics: an Intermediate Textbook for Students of Physics, Chemistry, and Engineering New York : McGraw-Hill Publishing Company.
  - Zemansky, Mark W.; Dittman, Richard H. (1997). Heat and Thermodynamics: An Intermediate Textbook (7th ed.). McGraw-Hill. ISBN 978-0-071-14816-0.
- Sears, Francis; Zemansky, Mark. (1947–1948). College Physics, 2 volumes, Cambridge, MA: Addison-Wesley Press
  - Sears, Francis; Zemansky, Mark; et al. (1991). College Physics (7th ed.). Addison Wesley.
- Sears, Francis; Zemansky, Mark; Young, Hugh; Freedman, Roger (2019). University Physics (15th ed.). Pearson Education. ISBN 978-0-135-15955-2.
- Zemansky, Mark W. (1964). Temperatures Very Low and Very High. Princeton, New Jersey: D. Van Nostrand Company. Reprinted 1981 by Dover Publications. ISBN 978-0-486-24072-5.

== See also ==
- Herbert Callen
