= Acousto-optic deflector =

Device that deflects or redirects a laser beam

An acousto-optic deflector (AOD) is a device that uses the interaction between sound waves and light waves to deflect or redirect a laser beam. AODs are essentially the same as acousto-optic modulators (AOMs). In both an AOM and an AOD, the amplitude and frequency of different orders are adjusted as light is diffracted.

== Operation ==
In the operation of an acousto-optic deflector the power driving the acoustic transducer is kept on, at a constant level, while the acoustic frequency is varied to deflect the beam to different angular positions. The acousto-optic deflector makes use of the acoustic frequency dependent diffraction angle, where a change in the angle $\Delta \theta_d$ as a function of the change in frequency $\Delta f$ given as,

$$(12) \ \Delta \theta_d = \frac{\lambda}{\nu}\Delta f$$

where $\lambda$ is the optical wavelength and $\nu$ is the velocity of the acoustic wave.

== Impact ==
AOM technology has made Bose–Einstein condensation practical, for which the 2001 Nobel Prize in Physics was awarded to Eric A. Cornell, Wolfgang Ketterle and Carl E. Wieman. Another application of acoustic-optical deflection is optical trapping of small molecules.

== See also ==
- Acousto-optic modulator
- Acousto-optics
- Acousto-optical spectrometer
- Nonlinear optics
- Sonoluminescence
