= Theta solvent =

Solvent property in polymer science

In a polymer solution, a theta solvent (or θ solvent) is a solvent in which polymer coils act like ideal chains, assuming exactly their random walk coil dimensions. Therefore, the Mark–Houwink equation exponent is $1/2$ in a theta solvent. Thermodynamically, the excess chemical potential of mixing between a polymer and a theta solvent is zero.

== Physical interpretation ==
The conformation assumed by a polymer chain in dilute solution can be modeled as a random walk of monomer subunits using a freely jointed chain model. However, this model does not account for steric effects. Real polymer coils are more closely represented by a self-avoiding walk because conformations in which different chain segments occupy the same space are not physically possible. This excluded volume effect causes the polymer to expand.

Chain conformation is also affected by solvent quality. The intermolecular interactions between polymer chain segments and coordinated solvent molecules have an associated energy of interaction which can be positive or negative. For a good solvent, interactions between polymer segments and solvent molecules are energetically favorable, and will cause polymer coils to expand. For a poor solvent, polymer-polymer self-interactions are preferred, and the polymer coils will contract. The quality of the solvent depends on both the chemical compositions of the polymer and solvent molecules and the solution temperature.

=== Theta temperature ===
If a solvent is precisely poor enough to cancel the effects of excluded volume expansion, the theta (θ) condition is satisfied. For a given polymer-solvent pair, the theta condition is satisfied at a certain temperature, called the theta (θ) temperature or theta point. A solvent at this temperature is called a theta solvent.

In general, measurements of the properties of polymer solutions depend on the solvent. However, when a theta solvent is used, the measured characteristics are independent of the solvent. They depend only on short-range properties of the polymer such as the bond length, bond angles, and sterically favorable rotations. The polymer chain will behave exactly as predicted by the random walk or ideal chain model. This makes experimental determination of important quantities such as the root mean square end-to-end distance or the radius of gyration much simpler.

Additionally, the theta condition is also satisfied in the bulk amorphous polymer phase. Thus, the conformations adopted by polymers dissolved in theta solvents are identical to those adopted in bulk polymer polymerization .

== Thermodynamic definition ==
Thermodynamically, the excess chemical potential of mixing between a theta solvent and a polymer is zero. Equivalently, the enthalpy of mixing is zero, making the solution ideal.

One cannot measure the chemical potential by any direct means, but one can correlate it to the solution's osmotic pressure ($\Pi$) and the solvent's partial specific volume ($v_s$):

$$\Delta\mu_1 = -v_s\Pi$$

One can use a virial expansion to express how osmotic pressure depends on concentration:

$$\frac{\Pi}{RT} = \frac{c}{M} + Bc^2 + B_3c^3...$$

M is the molecular weight of the polymer
R is the gas constant
T is the absolute temperature
B is the second virial coefficient

This relationship with osmotic pressure is one way to determine the theta condition or theta temperature for a solvent.

The change in the chemical potential when the two are mixed has two terms: ideal and excess:

$$\Delta\mu_1=\Delta\mu_1^{ideal}+\Delta\mu_1^{excess}$$

The second virial coefficient, B, is proportional to the excess chemical potential of mixing:

$$B=\frac{-\Delta\mu_1^{excess}}{{v_s}{c^2}}$$

B reflects the energy of binary interactions between solvent molecules and segments of polymer chain. When B > 0, the solvent is "good," and when B < 0, the solvent is "poor". For a theta solvent, the second virial coefficient is zero because the excess chemical potential is zero; otherwise it would fall outside the definition of a theta solvent. A solvent at its theta temperature is, in this way, analogous to a real gas at its Boyle temperature.

Similar relationships exist for other experimental techniques, including light scattering, intrinsic viscosity measurement, sedimentation equilibrium, and cloud point titration.

== See also ==
- Flory–Huggins solution theory
