= Bioconcentration =

Level of water-borne toxins in an organism

In aquatic toxicology, bioconcentration is the accumulation of a water-borne chemical substance in an organism exposed to the water.

There are several ways in which to measure and assess bioaccumulation and bioconcentration. These include: octanol-water partition coefficients (K_{OW}), bioconcentration factors (BCF), bioaccumulation factors (BAF) and biota-sediment accumulation factor (BSAF). Each of these can be calculated using either empirical data or measurements, as well as from mathematical models. One of these mathematical models is a fugacity-based BCF model developed by Don Mackay.

Bioconcentration factor can also be expressed as the ratio of the concentration of a chemical in an organism to the concentration of the chemical in the surrounding environment. The BCF is a measure of the extent of chemical sharing between an organism and the surrounding environment.

In surface water, the BCF is the ratio of a chemical's concentration in an organism to the chemical's aqueous concentration. BCF is often expressed in units of liters per kilogram (ratio of mg of chemical per kg of organism to mg of chemical per liter of water). BCF can simply be an observed ratio, or it can be the prediction of a partitioning model. A partitioning model is based on assumptions that chemicals partition between water and aquatic organisms as well as the idea that chemical equilibrium exists between the organisms and the aquatic environment in which it is found

== Calculation ==
Bioconcentration can be described by a bioconcentration factor (BCF), which is the ratio of the chemical concentration in an organism or biota to the concentration in water:

$BCF=\frac{Concentration_{Biota}}{Concentration_{Water}}$

Bioconcentration factors can also be related to the octanol-water partition coefficient, K_{ow}. The octanol-water partition coefficient (K_{ow}) is correlated with the potential for a chemical to bioaccumulate in organisms; the BCF can be predicted from log K_{ow}, via computer programs based on structure activity relationship (SAR) or through the linear equation:

$\log BCF=m \log K_{OW}+b$

Where:

$K_\text{OW}=\frac{Concentration_\text{octanol}}{Concentration_\text{water}}=\frac{C_\text{O}}{C_\text{W}}$ at equilibrium

=== Fugacity capacity ===
Fugacity and BCF relate to each other in the following equation:

$Z_\text{Fish}=\frac{P_\text{Fish}\times{BCF}}{H}$

where Z_{Fish} is equal to the fugacity capacity (mol/m^{3}/Pa) of a chemical in the fish, P_{Fish} is equal to the density of the fish (mass/length^{3}), BCF is the partition coefficient between the fish and the water (length^{3}/mass) and H is equal to the Henry's law constant (Pa m^{3}/mol)

=== Regression equations for estimations in fish ===
Equation	Chemicals Used to obtain equation	Species Used
$\log BCF=0.76\log K_\text{ow}-0.23$	84	Fathead Minnow, Bluegill Sunfish, Rainbow Trout, Mosquitofish
$\log BCF=\log K_\text{ow}-1.32$	44	Various
$\log BCF=2.791-0.564 \log S (S=\text{water solubility})$	36	Brook trout, Rainbow trout, Bluegill Sunfish, Fathead minnow, Carp
$\log BCF=3.41-0.508 \log S$	7	Various
$\log BCF=1.119 \log Koc-1.579$	13	Various

== Uses ==
=== Regulatory uses ===
Through the use of the PBT Profiler and using criteria set forth by the United States Environmental Protection Agency under the Toxic Substances Control Act (TSCA), a substance is considered to be not bioaccumulative if it has a BCF less than 1000, bioaccumulative if it has a BCF from 1000 to 5000 and very bioaccumulative if it has a BCF greater than 5000.

The thresholds under REACH are a BCF of > 2000 L/kg bzw. for the B and 5000 L/kg for vB criteria. A BCF of greater than 5000 in aquatic species is also the threshold for a persistent organic pollutant under the Stockholm Convention.

== Applications ==
A bioconcentration factor greater than 1 is indicative of a hydrophobic or lipophilic chemical. It is an indicator of how probable a chemical is to bioaccumulate. These chemicals have high lipid affinities and will concentrate in tissues with high lipid content instead of in an aqueous environment like the cytosol. Models are used to predict chemical partitioning in the environment which in turn allows the prediction of the biological fate of lipophilic chemicals.

=== Equilibrium partitioning models ===
Based on an assumed steady state scenario, the fate of a chemical in a system is modeled giving predicted endpoint phases and concentrations.

It needs to be considered that reaching steady state may need a substantial amount of time as estimated using the following equation (in hours).

$t_{eSS}=0.00654 \cdot K_{OW} + 55.31$

For a substance with a log(K_{OW}) of 4, it thus takes approximately five days to reach effective steady state. For a log(K_{OW}) of 6, the equilibrium time increases to nine months.

=== Fugacity models ===
Fugacity is another predictive criterion for equilibrium among phases that has units of pressure. It is equivalent to partial pressure for most environmental purposes. It is the absconding propensity of a material. BCF can be determined from output parameters of a fugacity model and thus used to predict the fraction of chemical immediately interacting with and possibly having an effect on an organism.

=== Food web models ===
If organism-specific fugacity values are available, it is possible to create a food web model which takes trophic webs into consideration. This is especially pertinent for conservative chemicals that are not easily metabolized into degradation products. Biomagnification of conservative chemicals such as toxic metals can be harmful to apex predators like orca whales, osprey, and bald eagles.

== Applications to toxicology ==
=== Predictions ===
Bioconcentration factors facilitate predicting contamination levels in an organism based on chemical concentration in surrounding water. BCF in this setting only applies to aquatic organisms. Air breathing organisms do not take up chemicals in the same manner as other aquatic organisms. Fish, for example uptake chemicals via ingestion and osmotic gradients in gill lamellae.

When working with benthic macroinvertebrates, both water and benthic sediments may contain chemical that affects the organism. Biota-sediment accumulation factor (BSAF) and biomagnification factor (BMF) also influence toxicity in aquatic environments.

BCF does not explicitly take metabolism into consideration so it needs to be added to models at other points through uptake, elimination or degradation equations for a selected organism.

=== Body burden ===
Chemicals with high BCF values are more lipophilic, and at equilibrium organisms will have greater concentrations of chemical than other phases in the system. Body burden is the total amount of chemical in the body of an organism, and body burdens will be greater when dealing with a lipophilic chemical.

== Biological factors ==
In determining the degree at which bioconcentration occurs biological factors have to be kept in mind. The rate at which an organism is exposed through respiratory surfaces and contact with dermal surfaces of the organism, competes against the rate of excretion from an organism. The rate of excretion is a loss of chemical from the respiratory surface, growth dilution, fecal excretion, and metabolic biotransformation. Growth dilution is not an actual process of excretion but due to the mass of the organism increasing while the contaminant concentration remains constant dilution occurs.

The interaction between inputs and outputs is shown here:
$\frac{dC_{B}}{dt}=(k_{1}C_{WD})-(k_{2}+k_{E}+k_{M}+k_{G})C_{B}$
The variables are defined as:
C_{B}is the concentration in the organism (g*kg^{−1}). t represents a unit of time (d^{−1}). k_{1} is the rate constant for chemical uptake from water at the respiratory surface (L*kg^{−1}*d^{−1}). C_{WD} is the chemical concentration dissolved in water (g*L^{−1}). k_{2},k_{E},k_{G},k_{B} are rate constants that represent excretion from the organism from the respiratory surface, fecal excretion, metabolic transformation, and growth dilution (d^{−1}).

Static variables influence BCF as well. Because organisms are modeled as bags of fat, lipid to water ratio is a factor that needs to be considered. Size also plays a role as the surface to volume ratio influence the rate of uptake from the surrounding water. The species of concern is a primary factor in influencing BCF values due to it determining all of the biological factors that alter a BCF.

== Environmental parameters ==
=== Temperature ===
Temperature may affect metabolic transformation, and bioenergetics. An example of this is the movement of the organism may change as well as rates of excretion. If a contaminant is ionic, the change in pH that is influenced by a change in temperature may also influence the bioavailability

=== Water quality ===
The natural particle content as well as organic carbon content in water can affect the bioavailability. The contaminant can bind to the particles in the water, making uptake more difficult, as well as become ingested by the organism. This ingestion could consist of contaminated particles which would cause the source of contamination to be from more than just water.
