= Mujeeb R. Malik =

Aerospace engineer

Mujeeb R. Malik is a Pakistani born American aerospace engineer serving as senior aerodynamicist at NASA Langley Research Center. He is known for his research in boundary layer stability, laminar-turbulent transition, computational methods and aerodynamic simulations. He was the architect of CFD Vision 2030, a NASA-sponsored study to advance the state-of-the-art of computational fluid dynamics (CFD) by exploiting high performance computing and modern validation experiments.

== Education and career ==
Malik received his bachelor's degree from University of Engineering and Technology, Lahore, in 1973. He received his master's degree from University of Toronto, Canada and Ph.D. from Iowa State University in 1978, where he specialized in computational fluid dynamics and heat transfer. He was president and chief scientist of High Technology Corporation, a research and development company he founded. At NASA, he served as the head of Computational Aerosciences Branch before being elevated to senior technologist (ST), technical equivalent of the Senior Executive Service.

== Honors and awards ==
In 2008, Malik was awarded the status of Fellow in the American Physical Society, after he was nominated by their Division of Fluid Dynamics, for pioneering contributions to the understanding of the breakdown of crossflow vortices in three-dimensional boundary layers, attachment-line and hypersonic boundary layer instability including real gas effects, and developing physics-based methods for the prediction of laminar-turbulent transition. He was elected Fellow of American Institute of Aeronautics and Astronautics, AIAA, in 2009, for notable contributions made to the arts, sciences, and technology of aeronautics and astronautics. in 2012, NASA presented him the Exceptional Service Medal, for distinguished supervisory and technical leadership for the advancement for aerodynamic technologies and their impact on Agency missions. He received NASA's Silver Achievement Medal in 2018, for excellence, teamwork and technical leadership in developing a path to revolutionary computational fluid dynamics for aerosciences. Malik is also a Fellow of American Society of Mechanical Engineers.

== Publications ==
- Malik, M. R. and Pletcher, R. H., “A Study of Some Turbulence Models for Flow and Heat Transfer in Ducts of Annular Cross-Section,” J. Heat Transfer, Vol. 103, February 1981, pp. 146–152.
- Hall, P., Malik, M. R. and Poll, D. I. A., “On the Stability of an Infinite Swept Attachment Line Boundary Layer,” Proc. Royal Society London A, 395, 1984, pp. 229–245.
- Malik, M. R., Zang, T. A. and Hussaini, M. Y., “A Spectral Collocation Method for the Navier-Stokes Equations,” J. Computational Physics, Vol. 61, No. 1, 1985, pp. 64–88.
- Malik, M. R., “The Neutral Curve for Stationary Disturbances in Rotating Disk Flow,” J. Fluid Mechanics, Vol. 164, 1986, pp. 275–287
- Malik, M. R. and Orszag, S. A., “Linear Stability Analysis of Three-Dimensional Compressible Boundary Layers,” J. Scientific Computing, Vol. 2, 1987, pp. 77–97.
- Van Rosendale, Malik, M. R. and Hussaini, M. Y., “Ion-Wind Effects on Poiseuille and Blasius Flow,” AIAA J., Vol. 26, 1988, pp. 961–968.
- Malik, M. R., “Prediction and Control of Transition in Supersonic and Hypersonic Boundary Layers,” AIAA J., Vol. 27, No. 11, 1989, pp. 1487–1493.
- Chen, F. J., Malik, M. R. and Beckwith, I. E., “Boundary Layer Transition on a Cone and Flat Plate at Mach 3.5,” AIAA J., Vol. 27, No. 6, 1989, pp. 687–693.
- Khorrami, M. R., Malik, M. R. and Ash, R. L., “Application of Spectral Collocation Techniques to the Stability of Swirling Flows,” J. Computational Physics, Vol. 81, No. 1, 1989, pp. 206–229.
- Malik, M. R., “Numerical Methods for Hypersonic Boundary Layer Stability,” J. Computational Physics, Vol. 86, No. 2, 1990, pp. 376–413.
- Malik, M. R., Spall, R. E. and Chang, C.-L., “Effect of Nose Bluntness on Boundary Layer Stability and Transition,” AIAA Paper 90-0112, AIAA 28th Aerospace Sciences Meeting, Reno, NV, January 1990.
- Malik, M. R. and Anderson, E. C., “Real Gas Effects on Hypersonic Boundary Layer Stability,” Physics of Fluids A, 3(5), 1991, pp. 803–821.
- Balachandar, S., Streett, C. L. and Malik, M. R., “Secondary Instability in Rotating Disk Flow,” J. Fluid Mechanics, Vol. 242, 1992, pp. 323–347.
- Chen, F. J., Malik, M. R. and Beckwith, I. E., “Gortler Instability and Supersonic Quiet Nozzle Design,” AIAA J., Vol. 30, No. 8, 1992, pp. 2093–2094.
- Balakumar, P. and Malik, M. R., “Discrete Modes and Continuous Spectra in Supersonic Boundary Layers,” J. Fluid Mechanics, Vol. 239, 1992, pp. 631–656.
- Chang, C.-L. and Malik, M. R., “Oblique-Mode Breakdown and Secondary Instability in Supersonic Boundary Layers,” J. Fluid Mechanics, Vol. 273, 1994, pp. 323–359.
- Lin, R. S. and Malik, M. R., “On the Stability of Attachment-Line Boundary Layers: Part 1. The Incompressible Swept Hiemenz Flow,” J. Fluid Mech., Vol. 311, 1996, pp. 239–255.
- Li, F. and Malik, M. R., “On the Nature of PSE Approximation,” Theoretical and Computational Fluid Dynamics, Vol. 8, 1996, pp. 253–273.
- Malik, M. R., Li, F., Choudhari, M. M. and Chang, C.-L., “Secondary Instability of Crossflow Vortices and Swept-Wing Boundary-Layer Transition,” J. Fluid Mechanics, Vol. 399, 1999, pp. 85–115.
- Malik, M. R., “Hypersonic Flight Transition Data Analysis using Parabolized Stability Equations with Chemistry Effect,” J. Spacecraft and Rockets, Vol. 40, No. 3, 2003, pp. 332–344.
- Malik, M. R. and Balakumar, P., “Acoustic Receptivity of Mach 4.5 Boundary Layer with Leading-Edge Bluntness,” Theoretical and Computational Fluid Dynamics, Vol. 21, 2007, pp. 323–342.
- Malik, M. R. and Bushnell, D. M., “Role of Computational Fluid Dynamics and Wind Tunnels in Aeronautics R&D,” NASA/TP-2012-217602.
- Malik, M. R., Crouch, J. D., Saric, W. S., Lin, J. C. and Whalen, E. A., “Application of Drag Reduction Techniques to Transport Aircraft," in Encyclopedia of Aerospace Engineering, (Eds.: R. Blockley and W. Shyy), John Wiley: Chichester. DOI: 10.1002/9780470686652.eae1013. Published 12/29/2015.
- Uzun, A. and Malik, M. R., “Wall-Resolved Large-Eddy Simulations of Transonic Shock-Induced Flow Separation,” AIAA Journal, Vol. 57, No. 5, 2019, pp. 1955–1972.
- Iyer, P. and Malik, M. R., “Analysis of the Equilibrium Wall Model for High-Sped Turbulent Flows,” Physical Review Fluids, Vol. 4, No. 7, 2019, Paper 074604.
