= Scale-free =

A scale-free object or system has scale invariance. More specifically scale-free may refer to:

- Scale-free ideal gas
- Scale-free network
