= Boyle temperature =

Thermodynamic property of real gas

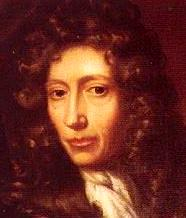
Robert Boyle, after whom this Temperature is named

The Boyle temperature, named after Robert Boyle, is formally defined as the temperature for which the second virial coefficient, $B_{2}(T)$, becomes zero. It is at this temperature that the attractive forces and the repulsive forces acting on the gas particles balance out

$P = RT \left(\frac{1}{V_m} + \frac{B_{2}(T)}{V_m^2} + \cdots \right)$

This is the virial equation of state and describes a real gas.

Since higher order virial coefficients are generally much smaller than the second coefficient, the gas tends to behave as an ideal gas over a wider range of pressures when the temperature reaches the Boyle temperature (or when $c = \frac{1}{V_m}$ or $P$ are minimized).

In any case, when the pressures are low, the second virial coefficient will be the only relevant one because the remaining concern terms of higher order on the pressure. Also at Boyle temperature the dip in a PV diagram tends to a straight line over a period of pressure. We then have

$$\frac{\mathrm{d}Z}{\mathrm{d}P} = 0 \qquad\mbox{if}~P \to 0$$

where $Z$ is the compressibility factor.

Expanding the van der Waals equation in $\frac{1}{V_m}$ one finds that $T_b = \frac{a}{Rb}$.

== See also ==
- Virial equation of state
