= Mayer f-function =

The Mayer f-function is an auxiliary function that often appears in the series expansion of thermodynamic quantities related to classical many-particle systems. It is named after chemist and physicist Joseph Edward Mayer.

== Definition ==
Consider a system of classical particles interacting through a pair-wise potential

$$V(\mathbf{i},\mathbf{j})$$

where the bold labels $\mathbf{i}$ and $\mathbf{j}$ denote the continuous degrees of freedom associated with the particles, e.g.,

$$\mathbf{i}=\mathbf{r}_i$$

for spherically symmetric particles and

$$\mathbf{i}=(\mathbf{r}_i,\Omega_i)$$

for rigid non-spherical particles where $\mathbf{r}$ denotes position and $\Omega$ the orientation parametrized e.g. by Euler angles. The Mayer f-function is then defined as

$$f(\mathbf{i},\mathbf{j})=e^{-\beta V(\mathbf{i},\mathbf{j})}-1$$

where $\beta=(k_{B}T)^{-1}$ the inverse absolute temperature in units of energy^{−1} .

== See also ==
- Virial coefficient
- Cluster expansion
- Excluded volume
