= Donald Mackay (scientist) =

Scottish-Canadian scientist and engineer (1936–2023)

Donald Mackay OC OOnt
- Born: October 30, 1936; Glasgow, Scotland
- Died: October 20, 2023 (aged 86); Peterborough, Ontario, Canada
- Scientific career
- Institutions: University of Toronto; Trent University

Donald Mackay OC OOnt (30 October 1936 – 20 October 2023) was a Scottish-born Canadian scientist and engineer specializing in environmental chemistry.

== Life and career ==
Donald Mackay was born on 30 October 1936. He was a member of the faculty of Chemical Engineering and Applied Chemistry at the University of Toronto and the founding director of the Canadian Environmental Modelling Centre at Trent University. He has developed several multimedia fugacity models. He has stressed that principles of good practice also need to be adopted for chemical assessments, especially in a regulatory context.

In 2004, Mackay was invested as an Officer of the Order of Canada for having "greatly contributed to the quality and our stewardship of the global environment". In 2004, he was also invested into the Order of Ontario for "his outstanding contributions to environmental science".

Mackay died at the Peterborough Regional Health Centre on 20 October 2023, at the age of 86.
