= Multimedia fugacity model =

Model for calculating equilibrium partitioning between different phases

Multimedia fugacity model is a model in environmental chemistry that summarizes the processes controlling chemical behavior in environmental media by developing and applying of mathematical statements or "models" of chemical fate.

Most chemicals have the potential to migrate from the medium to medium. Multimedia fugacity models are utilized to study and predict the behavior of chemicals in different environmental compartments.

The models are formulated using the concept of fugacity, which was introduced by Gilbert N. Lewis in 1901 as a criterion of equilibrium and convenient method of calculating multimedia equilibrium partitioning. The fugacity of chemicals is a mathematical expression that describes the rates at which chemicals diffuse, or are transported between phases. The transfer rate is proportional to the fugacity difference that exists between the source and destination phases. For building the model, the initial step is to set up a mass balance equation for each phase in question that includes fugacities, concentrations, fluxes and amounts. The important values are the proportionality constant, called fugacity capacity expressed as Z-values (SI unit: mol/m^{3} Pa) for a variety of media, and transport parameters expressed as D-values (SI unit: mol/Pa h) for processes such as advection, reaction and intermedia transport. The Z-values are calculated using the equilibrium partitioning coefficients of the chemicals, Henry's law constant and other related physical-chemical properties.

== Application of models ==
There are four levels of multimedia fugacity Models applied for prediction of fate and transport of organic chemicals in the multicompartmental environment:

Level I	Closed system in equilibrium	Equilibrium between compartments according to thermodynamics assumed (partition coefficients such as K_{OW}, K_{AW} or K_{S}); transformation and active transport not taken into account
Level II	Open system in equilibrium	In addition to level I: continuous emissions and transformation (e.g. biodegradation, photolysis) taken into account
Level III	Open system in steady state	In addition to level II: active transport and compartment-specific emissions taken into account
Level IV	Open system, non steady state	In addition to level III: dynamics of emissions and resulting temporal concentration course taken into account

Depending on the number of phases and complexity of processes different level models are applied. Many of the models apply to steady-state conditions and can be reformulated to describe time-varying conditions by using differential equations. The concept has been used to assess the relative propensity for chemicals to transform from temperate zones and “condense out” at the polar regions. The multicompartmental approach has been applied to the “quantitative water air sediment interaction" or "QWASI" model designed to assist in understanding chemical fate in lakes. Another application found in POPCYCLING-BALTIC model, which is describing fate of persistent organic pollutants in Baltic region.
