= Joseph Edward Mayer =

American chemist

- Born: February 5, 1904; New York City, U.S.
- Died: October 15, 1983 (aged 79)
- Known for: Mayer expansion; Mayer f-function; Born–Mayer equation; McMillan–Mayer theory
- Spouse: Maria Göppert (m. 1930; died 1972)
- Awards: Membership of NAS (1946); Peter Debye Award (1967)
- Scientific career
- Fields: Chemistry
- Workplaces: Johns Hopkins University; Columbia University; University of Chicago; University of California, San Diego

Joseph Edward Mayer (February 5, 1904 – October 15, 1983) was an American chemist who formulated the Mayer expansion in statistical field theory.

He was professor of chemistry at the University of California, San Diego from 1960 to 1972, and previously at Johns Hopkins University, Columbia University and the University of Chicago. He was married to Nobel Prize-winning physicist Maria Goeppert Mayer from 1930 until her death in 1972. He went to work with James Franck in Göttingen, Germany, in 1929, where he met Maria, a student of Max Born. He was a member of the United States National Academy of Sciences (1946), the American Academy of Arts and Sciences (1958), and the American Philosophical Society (1970). Joseph Mayer was president of the American Physical Society from 1973 to 1975.

== Scientific contributions ==
He developed the cluster expansion method and Mayer-McMillan solution theory.

== See also ==
- Mayer f-function
