= Fugacity capacity =

Proportional constant used to calculate the concentration of a chemical in a system

The fugacity capacity constant (Z) is used to help describe the concentration of a chemical in a system (usually in mol/m^{3}Pa). Hemond and Hechner-Levy (2000) describe how to utilize the fugacity capacity to calculate the concentration of a chemical in a system. Depending on the chemical, fugacity capacity varies. The concentration in media 'm' equals the fugacity capacity in media 'm' multiplied by the fugacity of the chemical. For a chemical system at equilibrium, the fugacity of the chemical will be the same in each media/phase/compartment. Therefore equilibrium is sometimes called "equifugacity" in the context of these calculations.

$$C_m = Z_m \cdot f$$

where Z is a proportional constant, termed fugacity capacity. This equation does not necessarily imply that C and f are always linearly related. Non-linearity can be accommodated by allowing Z to vary as a function of C or f.

For a better understanding of the fugacity capacity concept, heat capacity may provide a precedent for introducing Z as a capacity of a phase to absorb particular quantity of chemical. However, phases with high fugacity capacity do not necessarily retain high fugacity.

In calculations of fugacity capacity key factors would be (a) the nature of the solute (chemical), (b) the nature of the medium or compartment, (c) temperature.

== Expressions for fugacity capacity ==
The expression for Z_{m} is dependent on the media/phase/compartment. The following list gives the fugacity capacities for common medias:

- Air (under ideal gas assumptions): Z_{air} = 1/RT
- Water: Z_{water} = 1/H
- Octanol: Z_{oct} = K_{ow}/H
- Pure phase of target chemical: Z_{pure} = 1/P^{s}v

Where: R is the Ideal gas constant (8.314 Pa·m^{3}/mol·K); T is the absolute temperature (K); H is the Henry's law constant for the target chemical (Pa/m^{3}mol); K_{ow} is the octanol-water partition coefficient for the target chemical (dimensionless ratio); P^{s} is the vapor pressure of the target chemical (Pa); and v is the molar volume of the target chemical (m^{3}/mol).

Notice that the ratio between Z-values for different media (e.g. octanol and water) is the same as the ratio between the concentrations of the target chemical in each media at equilibrium.

When using a fugacity capacity approach to calculate the concentrations of a chemical in each of several medias/phases/compartments, it is often convenient to calculate the prevailing fugacity of the system using the following equation if the total mass of target chemical (M_{T}) and the volume of each compartment (V_{m}) are known:

$$f = M_T / \Sigma_m (V_m Z_m)$$

Alternatively, if the target chemical is present as a pure phase at equilibrium, its vapor pressure will be the prevailing fugacity of the system.

== See also ==
- Multimedia fugacity model
