= Real gas =

Non-hypothetical gases whose molecules occupy space and have interactions

Isotherms of real gas Dark blue curves – isotherms below the critical temperature. Green sections – metastable states. The section to the left of point F – normal liquid. Point F – boiling point. Line FG – equilibrium of liquid and gaseous phases. Section FA – superheated liquid. Section F′A – stretched liquid (p<0). Section AC – analytic continuation of isotherm, physically impossible. Section CG – supercooled vapor. Point G – dew point. The plot to the right of point G – normal gas. Areas FAB and GCB are equal. Red curve – Critical isotherm. Point K – critical point. Light blue curves – supercritical isotherms

Real gases are non-ideal gases whose molecules occupy space and have interactions; consequently, they do not adhere to the ideal gas law. To understand the behaviour of real gases, the following must be taken into account:

- compressibility effects;
- variable specific heat capacity;
- van der Waals forces;
- non-equilibrium thermodynamic effects;
- issues with molecular dissociation and elementary reactions with variable composition

For most applications, such a detailed analysis is unnecessary, and the ideal gas approximation can be used with reasonable accuracy. On the other hand, real-gas models have to be used near the condensation point of gases, near critical points, at very high pressures, to explain the Joule–Thomson effect, and in other less usual cases. The deviation from ideality can be described by the compressibility factor Z.

== Models ==
=== Van der Waals model ===
Real gases are often modeled by taking into account their molar weight and molar volume:
$$\begin{align}
RT &= \left(p + \frac{a}{V_\text{m}^2}\right)\left(V_\text{m} - b\right)\\
p &= \frac{RT}{V_m - b} - \frac{a}{V_m^2}
\end{align}$$

Where p is pressure, T is temperature, R is the ideal gas constant, and V_{m} is the molar volume. a and b are parameters that are determined empirically for each gas, but are sometimes estimated from their critical temperature (T_{c}) and critical pressure (p_{c}) using these relations:
$$\begin{align}
a &= \frac{27R^2 T_\text{c}^2}{64p_\text{c}}, &
b &= \frac{RT_\text{c}}{8p_\text{c}}
\end{align}$$

The constants at the critical point can be expressed as functions of the parameters a and b:
$$\begin{align}
p_c &= \frac{a}{27b^2}, &
V_{m,c} &= 3b, \\[2pt]
T_c &= \frac{8a}{27bR}, &
Z_c &= \frac{3}{8}
\end{align}$$

With the reduced properties $p_r = p / p_\text{c}$, $V_r = V_\text{m} / V_\text{m,c}$, $T_r = T / T_\text{c}$ the equation can be written in the reduced form:
$$p_r = \frac{8}{3}\frac{T_r}{V_r - \frac{1}{3}} - \frac{3}{V_r^2}$$

=== Redlich–Kwong model ===
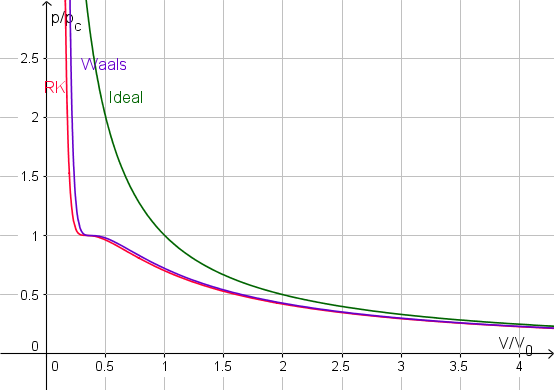
Critical isotherm for Redlich-Kwong model in comparison to van-der-Waals model and ideal gas (with V_{0}=RT_{c}/p_{c})

The Redlich–Kwong equation is another two-parameter equation that is used to model real gases. It is almost always more accurate than the van der Waals equation, and often more accurate than some equations with more than two parameters. The equation is
$$RT = \left(p + \frac{a}{\sqrt{T}V_\text{m}\left(V_\text{m} + b\right)}\right)\left(V_\text{m} - b\right)$$

or alternatively:
$$p = \frac{RT}{V_\text{m} - b} - \frac{a}{\sqrt{T}V_\text{m}\left(V_\text{m} + b\right)}$$

where a and b are two empirical parameters that are not the same parameters as in the van der Waals equation. These parameters can be determined:
$$\begin{align}
a &= 0.42748\, \frac{R^2{T_\text{c}}^\frac{5}{2}}{p_\text{c}}, \\[2pt]
b &= 0.08664\, \frac{RT_\text{c}}{p_\text{c}}
\end{align}$$

The constants at critical point can be expressed as functions of the parameters a, b:
$$\begin{align}
p_c &= {\left[\frac{(\sqrt[3]{2} - 1)^7}{3} \, R \, \frac{a^2}{b^5}\right]}^{1/3}, &
V_{m,c} &= \frac{b}{\sqrt[3]{2}-1}, \\[4pt]
T_c &= {\left[3 {\left(\sqrt[3]{2} - 1\right)}^2 \frac{a}{bR}\right]}^{2/3}, &
Z_c &= \frac{1}{3}
\end{align}$$

Using $p_r = p/p_\text{c}$, $V_r = V_\text{m}/V_\text{m,c}$, $T_r = T / T_\text{c}$ the equation of state can be written in the reduced form:
$$\begin{align}
p_r &= \frac{3 T_r}{V_r - b_r} - \frac{1}{b_r\sqrt{T_r} V_r \left(V_r + b_r\right)}\\
&= \frac{3 T_r}{V_r - b_r} - \frac{b_r^{-1}}{\sqrt{T_r} V_r \left(V_r + b_r\right)}\\
b_r &= \sqrt[3]{2} - 1 \approx 0.26\\
b_r^{-1} &= \frac{1}{\sqrt[3]{2} - 1} \approx 3.8473\\
\end{align}$$

=== Berthelot and modified Berthelot model ===
The Berthelot equation (named after D. Berthelot) is very rarely used,
$$p = \frac{RT}{V_\text{m} - b} - \frac{a}{TV_\text{m}^2}$$

but the modified version is somewhat more accurate
$$p = \frac{RT}{V_\text{m}} \left[1 + \frac{9}{128} \cdot \frac{p}{p_c} \cdot \frac{T_c}{T} \left(1 - 6 \frac{T_\text{c}^2}{T^2}\right)\right]$$

=== Dieterici model ===
This model (named after C. Dieterici) fell out of usage in recent years
$$p = \frac{RT}{V_\text{m} - b} \exp\left(-\frac{a}{V_\text{m}RT}\right)$$

with parameters a, b. These can be normalized by dividing with the critical point state (Note: The critical state can be calculated by starting with $p = \frac{RT}{{(V_m-b)} e^{\frac{a}{RTV_m}}}$, and taking the derivative with respect to $V_m$. The equation $(\partial_{V_m}p)_T = 0$ is a quadratic equation in $V_m$, and it has a double root precisely when $V_m = V_c; T=T_c$.):
$$\tilde p = p \frac{(2be)^2}{a}; \quad \tilde T =T \frac{4bR}{a}; \quad \tilde V_m = V_m \frac{1}{2b}$$
which casts the equation into the reduced form:
$$\tilde p \left(2\tilde V_m - 1\right) = \tilde T \exp\left(2 - \frac{2}{\tilde T \tilde V_m}\right)$$

=== Clausius model ===
The Clausius equation (named after Rudolf Clausius) is a very simple three-parameter equation used to model gases.
$$RT = \left(p + \frac{a}{T {\left(V_\text{m} + c\right)}^2}\right) \left(V_\text{m} - b\right)$$

or alternatively:
$$p = \frac{RT}{V_\text{m} - b} - \frac{a}{T\left(V_\text{m} + c\right)^2}$$

where
$$\begin{align}
a &= \frac{27R^2 T_\text{c}^3}{64p_\text{c}}, \\[4pt]
b &= V_\text{c} - \frac{RT_\text{c}}{4p_\text{c}}, \\[4pt]
c &= \frac{3RT_\text{c}}{8p_\text{c}} - V_\text{c}
\end{align}$$

where V_{c} is critical volume.

=== Virial model ===
The Virial equation derives from a perturbative treatment of statistical mechanics.
$$pV_\text{m} = RT\left[1 + \frac{B(T)}{V_\text{m}} + \frac{C(T)}{V_\text{m}^2} + \frac{D(T)}{V_\text{m}^3} + \cdots\right]$$

or alternatively
$$pV_\text{m} = RT \left[1 + B'(T) p + C'(T) p^2 + D'(T) p^3 + \cdots\right]$$

where A, B, C, A′, B′, and C′ are temperature dependent constants.

=== Peng–Robinson model ===
Peng–Robinson equation of state (named after D.-Y. Peng and D. B. Robinson) has the interesting property of being useful in modeling some liquids as well as real gases.
$$p = \frac{RT}{V_\text{m} - b} - \frac{a(T)}{V_\text{m}\left(V_\text{m} + b\right) + b\left(V_\text{m} - b\right)}$$

=== Wohl model ===
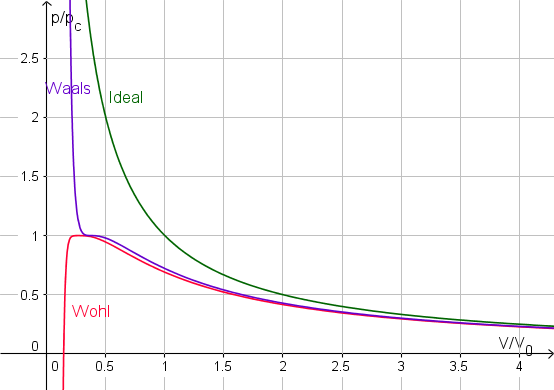
Isotherm (V/V_{0}->p_r) at critical temperature for Wohl model, van der Waals model and ideal gas model (with V_{0}=RT_{c}/p_{c})

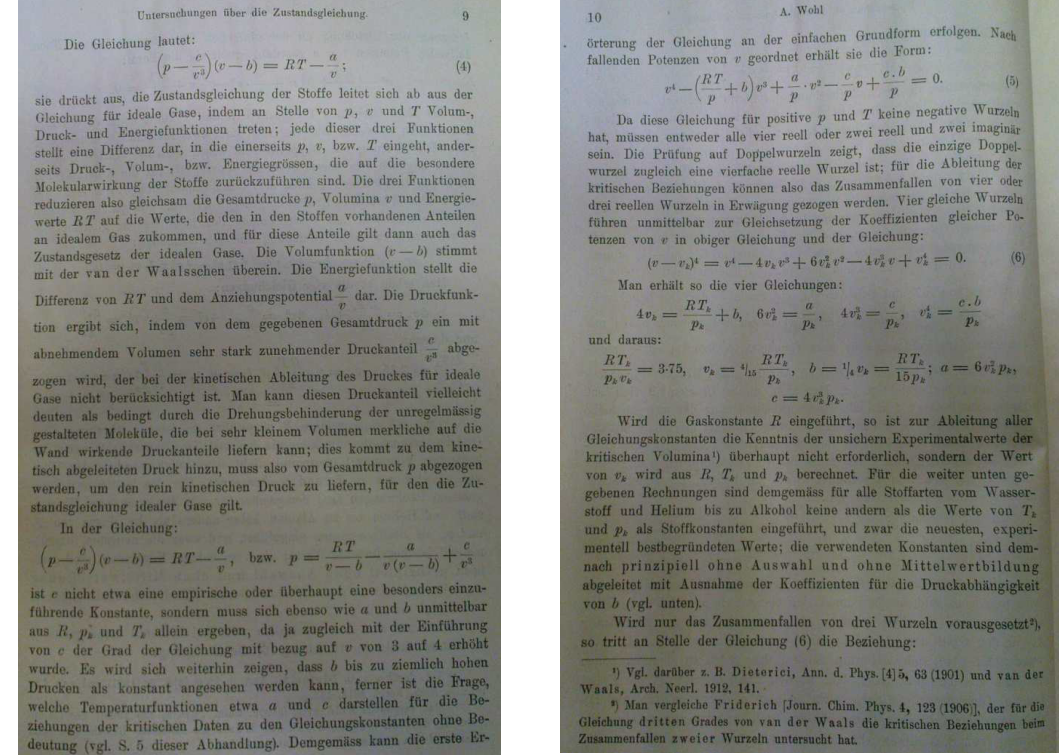
Untersuchungen über die Zustandsgleichung, pp. 9,10, Zeitschr. f. Physikal. Chemie 87

The Wohl equation (named after A. Wohl) is formulated in terms of critical values, making it useful when real gas constants are not available, but it cannot be used for high densities, as for example the critical isotherm shows a drastic decrease of pressure when the volume is contracted beyond the critical volume.
$$p = \frac{RT}{V_\text{m} - b} - \frac{a}{TV_\text{m}\left(V_\text{m} - b\right)} + \frac{c}{T^2 V_\text{m}^3}\quad$$

or:
$$\left(p - \frac{c}{T^2 V_\text{m}^3}\right)\left(V_\text{m} - b\right) = RT - \frac{a}{TV_\text{m}}$$

or, alternatively:
$$RT = \left(p + \frac{a}{TV_\text{m}(V_\text{m} - b)} - \frac{c}{T^2 V_\text{m}^3}\right)\left(V_\text{m} - b\right)$$

where
$$\begin{align}
a &= 6p_\text{c} T_\text{c} V_\text{m,c}^2, &
b &= \frac{V_\text{m,c}}{4}, \\[2pt]
c &= 4p_\text{c} T_\text{c}^2 V_\text{m,c}^3
\end{align}$$
where $V_\text{m,c} = \frac{4}{15}\frac{RT_c}{p_c}$, $p_\text{c}$, $T_c$ are (respectively) the molar volume, the pressure and the temperature at the critical point.

And with the reduced properties $p_r = p/p_\text{c}$, $V_r = V_\text{m} / V_\text{m,c}$, $T_r = T / T_\text{c}$ one can write the first equation in the reduced form:
$$p_r = \frac{15}{4}\frac{T_r}{V_r - \frac{1}{4}} - \frac{6}{T_r V_r\left(V_r - \frac{1}{4}\right)} + \frac{4}{T_r^2 V_r^3}$$

=== Beattie–Bridgeman model ===
This equation is based on five experimentally determined constants. It is expressed as
$$p = \frac{RT}{V_\text{m}^2}\left(1 - \frac{c}{V_\text{m}T^3}\right)(V_\text{m} + B) - \frac{A}{V_\text{m}^2}$$

where
$$\begin{align}
A &= A_0 \left(1 - \frac{a}{V_\text{m}}\right), &
B &= B_0 \left(1 - \frac{b}{V_\text{m}}\right)
\end{align}$$

This equation is known to be reasonably accurate for densities up to about 0.8 ρ_{cr}, where ρ_{cr} is the density of the substance at its critical point. The constants appearing in the above equation are available in the following table when p is in kPa, V_{m} is in $\frac{\text{m}^3}{\text{k}\,\text{mol}}$, T is in K and $R = 8.314 \mathrm{\frac{kPa \cdot m^3}{kmol \cdot K}}$

Gas	A_{0}	a	B_{0}	b	c
Air	131.8441	0.01931	0.04611	−0.001101	4.34×10^{4}
Argon, Ar	130.7802	0.02328	0.03931	0.0	5.99×10^{4}
Carbon dioxide, CO_{2}	507.2836	0.07132	0.10476	0.07235	6.60×10^{5}
Ethane, C_{2}H_{6}	595.791	0.05861	0.09400	0.01915	90.00×10^{4}
Helium, He	2.1886	0.05984	0.01400	0.0	40
Hydrogen, H_{2}	20.0117	−0.00506	0.02096	−0.04359	504
Methane, CH_{4}	230.7069	0.01855	0.05587	-0.01587	12.83×10^{4}
Nitrogen, N_{2}	136.2315	0.02617	0.05046	−0.00691	4.20×10^{4}
Oxygen, O_{2}	151.0857	0.02562	0.04624	0.004208	4.80×10^{4}

=== Benedict–Webb–Rubin model ===
The BWR equation,
$$p = RTd + d^2\left(RT(B + bd) - \left(A + ad - a\alpha d^4\right) - \frac{1}{T^2}\left[C - cd\left(1 + \gamma d^2\right) \exp\left(-\gamma d^2\right)\right]\right)$$

where d is the molar density and where a, b, c, A, B, C, α, and γ are empirical constants. Note that the γ constant is a derivative of constant α and therefore almost identical to 1.

== Thermodynamic expansion work ==
The expansion work of the real gas is different than that of the ideal gas by the quantity $\int_{V_i}^{V_f} \left(\frac{RT}{V_m} - P_\text{real}\right) dV$.

== See also ==
- Compressibility factor
- Equation of state
- Ideal gas law: Boyle's law and Gay-Lussac's law
