= Timeline of states of matter and phase transitions =

This is a timeline of states of matter and phase transitions, specifically discoveries related to either of these topics.

== Timeline ==
=== Antiquity ===
- c. 450 BC – Empedocles introduces the four classical element (earth, water, air, fire).
- c. 340 BC – Aristotle in his work Meteorology, expand on the classical elements and describes the water cycle. His cycle includes evaporation of water, formation of clouds, snow and rain.
- c. 77 AD – Pliny the Elder in his Natural History, concludes that clouds are formed by the condensation of air.
- c. 439 AD – Proclus in his Commentary on Plato's Timaeus, categorizes the four elements using three binary qualities sharp/blunt, subtle/dense and mobile/inmobile.

=== Before 18th century ===
- 7th century – Jabir ibn Hayyan (Geber) proposes four primary qualities: hotness, coldness, dryness, moistness. The classical elements can hold only two of these qualities. Metals internal qualities are different from their external qualities.
- 1260 – First detailed description of snowflakes by Albertus Magnus.
- 1471 – Alchemist George Ripley describes 12 main alchemical processes including congelation and sublimation.
- 1530 – Alchemist Paracelsus proposes his theory of tria prima were primary elements being: a combustible element (sulfur), a liquid changeable element (mercury) and solid element (salt).
- 1637 – René Descartes rejects the hypothesis that water vapor is the same as air.
- 1648 – Jan Baptist van Helmont coins the term gas.
- c. 1660 – Otto von Guericke carries experiment to demonstrate the artificial formation of fog.
- 1669 – Johann Joachim Becher, influenced by Paracelsus, proposes a model in his Physica subterranea, where all matter is composed of the elements air, water and three earths: terra lapidea (vitrieous earth) related to its fusibility, terra fluida (mercurial earth) contributing to fluidity and volatility, and terra pinguis (fatty earth) related to combustibility and flammability.

=== 18th century ===
- 1724 – Daniel Gabriel Fahrenheit discovers supercooling, while developing the Fahrenheit scale.
- 1730 – René Antoine Ferchault de Réaumur develops the Réaumur scale, calibrated between the freezing point (0°R) and the boiling point of water (80°R).
- 1742 – Anders Celsius develops the Celsius scale, calibrated where its 0°C are defined at the freezing point of water and 100°C at the boiling point of water.
- 1751 – Charles Le Roy describes clouds as suspension of water.
- 1756 – William Cullen provides the first demonstration of artificial refrigeration.
- 1762 – Joseph Black discovers latent heat.
- 1780 – Antoine Lavoisier postulates three states of matter: solids, liquids and vapors.
- 1784 – Liquefaction of sulfur dioxide by compression and cooling by Jean-François Clouet and Gaspard Monge.

=== 19th century ===
- 1822 – Charles Cagniard de la Tour discovers the critical point (called de la Tour point at the time). His experiments with sealed cannons mark the discovery of supercritical fluids.
- 1823 – Systematic studies of the liquefaction of gases by Michael Faraday. He removes the distinction between vapour and gas.
- 1824 – Nicolas Léonard Sadi Carnot publishes Reflections on the Motive Power of Fire, introducing the earliest version of Clausius–Clapeyron relation which characterizes the transition between two phases of matter.
- 1834 – Émile Clapeyron works out his version of the Clausius–Clapeyron relation.
- 1850 – Rudolf Clausius reformulates the Clausius–Clayperon relation.
- 1861 – Dmitri Mendeleev establishes the critical temperature, he calls de la Tour point, the absolute boiling point.
- 1869 – Thomas Andrews studies of liquefaction of gases. He standardizes and coins the term critical point, critical temperature and critical pressure. He also discovers critical opalescence.
- 1868 – Dmitry Chernov introduces the critical points of steel.
- 1873 – James Thomson coins the term triple point of water.
- 1873 –Johannes Diderik van der Waals thesis. He explains that water-vapour transition by introducing van der Waals equation and the van der Waals force.
- 1875 –James Clerk Maxwell introduces his Maxwell construction for state transitions.
- 1875-1876 – Josiah Willard Gibbs introduces the concept of "phase". See also his phase rule published in "On the Equilibrium of Heterogeneous Substances" paper.
- 1879 – William Crookes first identifies plasma in laboratory
- 1881 – John Aitken demonstrate that in fog, water condenses on particles in air. He also establishes the dew point.
- 1888–1889 – Crystalline optical properties of liquid crystals and their ability to flow are first described by Friedrich Reinitzer and confirmed by Otto Lehmann.
- 1887 – Floris Osmond introduces the different names for the phases of steel.
- 1895 – Pierre Curie discovers that induced magnetization is proportional to magnetic field strength

=== 20th century ===
- 1900 – Gustav Heinrich Tammann discovers the phases of ice: ice II and ice III.
- 1911 – Heike Kamerlingh Onnes discloses his research on superconductivity
- 1908 – Marian Smoluchowski explains critical opalescence with fluctuations of density.
- 1912 – Peter Debye derives the T^{3} law for the low temperature heat capacity of a nonmetallic solid
- 1912 – Percy Williams Bridgman, systematic study of the phases of ice. He find ice VI, V and VI.
- 1919 – Gustav Heinrich Tammann predicts an order-disorder transition in metal alloys at low temperature.
- 1924–1925 – Bose–Einstein condensate was first predicted, generally, by Albert Einstein
- 1925 – Ernst Ising presents the solution to the one-dimensional Ising model
- 1928 – Felix Bloch applies quantum mechanics to electrons in crystal lattices, establishing the quantum theory of solids
- 1929 – Paul Adrien Maurice Dirac and Werner Karl Heisenberg develop the quantum theory of ferromagnetism
- 1932 – Louis Eugène Félix Néel discovers antiferromagnetism
- 1933 – Paul Ehrenfest classifies the general types of phases transitions.
- 1933 – Walther Meissner and Robert Ochsenfeld discover perfect superconducting diamagnetism
- 1933 – Walter Baade and Fritz Zwicky propose the existence of neutron stars, made of neutronium.
- 1933–1937 – Lev Landau develops the Landau theory of phase transitions
- 1935 – Lev Shubnikov discovers type-II superconductivity.
- 1936 – Ukichiro Nakaya makes extensive studies of snow formation. He creates the first artificial snowflakes.
- 1937 – Pyotr Leonidovich Kapitsa and John Frank Allen/Don Misener discover superfluidity
- 1937 – Jan Hendrik de Boer and Evert Verwey, and independently Nevill Mott develop the theory of metal–insulator transition and Mott transition.
- 1941 – Landau explains superfluidity
- 1942 – Hannes Alfvén predicts magnetohydrodynamic waves in plasmas
- 1944 – Lars Onsager publishes the exact solution to the two-dimensional Ising model
- 1950 – Landau and Vitaly Ginzburg develop Ginzburg–Landau theory
- 1957 – John Bardeen, Leon Cooper, and Robert Schrieffer develop the BCS theory of superconductivity
- 1957 – Landau develops the theory of Fermi liquid
- 1958 –John W. Cahn and John E. Hilliard develop the mathematical treatment of phase separation, known as Cahn–Hilliard equation.
- 1959 – Philip Warren Anderson predicts localization in disordered systems
- 1972 – Douglas Osheroff, Robert C. Richardson, and David M. Lee discover that helium-3 can become a superfluid
- 1974 – Kenneth G. Wilson develops the renormalization group technique for treating phase transitions
- 1980 – Klaus von Klitzing discovers the quantum Hall effect
- 1982 – Horst L. Störmer and Daniel C. Tsui discover the fractional quantum Hall effect
- 1983 – Robert B. Laughlin explains the fractional quantum Hall effect
- 1986 – Karl Alexander Müller and Georg Bednorz discover high-temperature superconductivity
- 1995 – Eric Cornell and Carl Wieman produce the first Bose–Einstein condensate using rubidium atoms
- 1997 – Steven T. Bramwell and Mark J. Harris team find a compound that behaves as spin ice at low temperatures.

=== 21st century ===
- 2000 – CERN announced quark-gluon plasma, a new phase of matter.
- 2024 –Altermagnetism is discovered.

== See also ==
- List of states of matter
