= Tie line =

Tie line may refer to:

- Tie line (telephony), a circuit between two telephone exchanges.
- Tie line (electrical grid), an electrical circuit connecting balancing authorities.
- Tie line, an isothermal line through a two-phase region on a phase diagram.
