= Johannes Diderik van der Waals =

Dutch physicist (1837–1923)

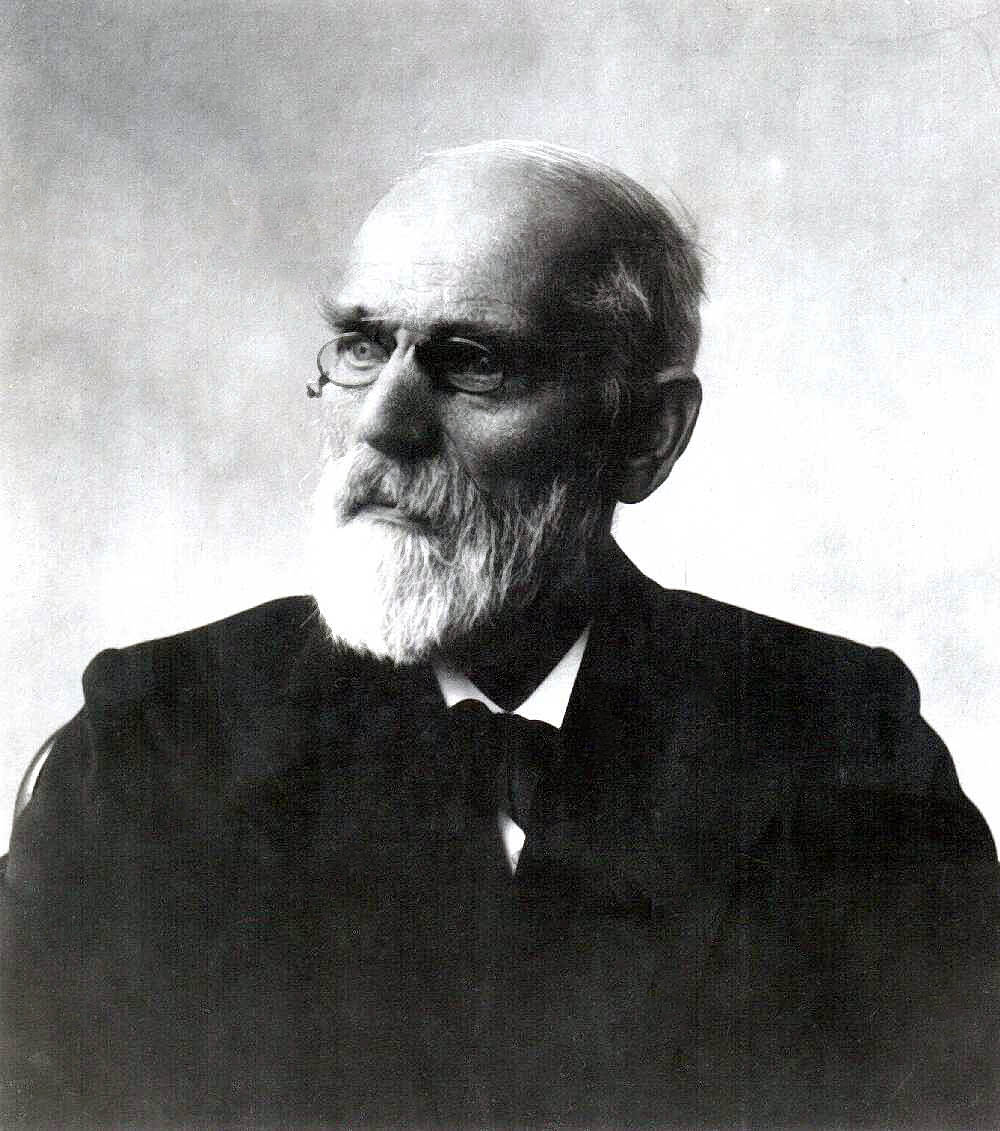
- Van der Waals in 1910
- Born: 23 November 1837; Leiden, Netherlands
- Died: 8 March 1923 (aged 85); Amsterdam, Netherlands
- Education: Leiden University (PhD)
- Known for: Van der Waals equation
- Spouse: Anna Magdalena Smit (m. 1865; died 1881)
- Children: 4
- Relatives: Joan van der Waals (first cousin, twice removed)
- Awards: Nobel Prize in Physics (1910)
- Scientific career
- Fields: Physics
- Workplaces: Municipal University of Amsterdam
- Thesis: Over de continuïteit van den gas- en vloeistoftoestand (1873)
- Doctoral advisor: Pieter Rijke
- Doctoral students: Willem Hendrik Keesom; Diederik Korteweg

Johannes Diderik van der Waals (Dutch: [joːˈɦɑnəz ˈdidərɪk fɑn dər ˈʋaːls]; (Note: Johannes and van in isolation: [joːˈɦɑnəs] and [vɑn]) 23 November 1837 – 8 March 1923) was a Dutch theoretical physicist who received the Nobel Prize in Physics in 1910 "for his work on the equation of state for gases and liquids." Van der Waals started his career as a schoolteacher, before becoming the first physics professor of the University of Amsterdam when its status was upgraded to Municipal University in 1877.

His name is primarily associated with the van der Waals equation, an equation of state that describes the behavior of gases and their condensation to the liquid phase. His name is also associated with van der Waals forces (forces between stable molecules), with van der Waals molecules (small molecular clusters bound by van der Waals forces), and with the van der Waals radius (size of molecules). James Clerk Maxwell once said that, "there can be no doubt that the name of Van der Waals will soon be among the foremost in molecular science."

In his 1873 thesis, Van der Waals noted the non-ideality of real gases and attributed it to the existence of intermolecular interactions. He introduced the first equation of state derived by the assumption of a finite volume occupied by the constituent molecules. Spearheaded by Ernst Mach and Wilhelm Ostwald, a strong philosophical current that denied the existence of molecules arose towards the end of the 19th century. The molecular existence was considered unproven and the molecular hypothesis unnecessary. At the time Van der Waals's thesis was written (1873), the molecular structure of fluids had not been accepted by most physicists, and liquid and vapor were often considered as chemically distinct. But Van der Waals's work affirmed the reality of molecules and allowed an assessment of their size and attractive strength. His new formula revolutionized the study of equations of state. By comparing his equation of state with experimental data, Van der Waals was able to obtain estimates for the actual size of molecules and the strength of their mutual attraction.

The effect of Van der Waals's work on molecular physics in the 20th century was direct and fundamental. By introducing parameters characterizing molecular size and attraction in constructing his equation of state, Van der Waals set the tone for modern molecular science. That molecular aspects such as size, shape, attraction, and multipolar interactions should form the basis for mathematical formulations of the thermodynamic and transport properties of fluids is presently considered an axiom. With the help of the Van der Waals's equation of state, the critical-point parameters of gases could be accurately predicted from thermodynamic measurements made at much higher temperatures. Nitrogen, oxygen, hydrogen, and helium subsequently succumbed to liquefaction. Heike Kamerlingh Onnes was significantly influenced by the pioneering work of Van der Waals. In 1908, Onnes became the first to make liquid helium; this led directly to his 1911 discovery of superconductivity.

== Biography ==
=== Early years and education ===
Johannes Diderik van der Waals was born on 23 November 1837 in Leiden, Netherlands, the eldest of ten children of Jacobus van der Waals, a carpenter, and Elisabeth van den Berg.

As was usual for all girls and working-class boys in the 19th century, Van der Waals did not go to the kind of secondary school that would have given him the right to enter university. Instead he went to a school of "advanced primary education", which he finished at the age of fifteen. He then became a teacher's apprentice in an elementary school. Between 1856 and 1861 he followed courses and gained the necessary qualifications to become a primary school teacher and head teacher.

In 1862, Van der Waals began to attend lectures in mathematics, physics and astronomy at the university in his city of birth, although he was not qualified to be enrolled as a regular student in part because of his lack of education in classical languages. However, Leiden University had a provision that enabled outside students to take up to four courses a year. In 1863 the Dutch government started a new kind of secondary school (HBS, a school aiming at the children of the higher middle classes). Van der Waals—at that time head of an elementary school—wanted to become a HBS teacher in mathematics and physics and spent two years studying in his spare time for the required examinations.

In 1865, Van der Waals was appointed as a physics teacher at the HBS in Deventer and in 1866, he received such a position in The Hague, which was close enough to Leiden to allow Van der Waals to resume his courses at the university there. In September 1865, just before moving to Deventer, Van der Waals married the eighteen-year-old Anna Magdalena Smit.

=== Professorship ===
Van der Waals still lacked the knowledge of the classical languages that would have given him the right to enter university as a regular student and to take examinations. However, it so happened that the law regulating the university entrance was changed and dispensation from the study of classical languages could be given by the minister of education. Van der Waals was given this dispensation and passed the qualification exams in physics and mathematics for doctoral studies.

At Leiden University, on June 14, 1873, van der Waals defended his doctoral thesis Over de Continuïteit van den Gas- en Vloeistoftoestand (on the continuity of the gaseous and liquid state) under Pieter Rijke. In the thesis, he introduced the concepts of molecular volume and molecular attraction.

In September 1877, van der Waals was appointed the first professor of physics at the newly founded Municipal University of Amsterdam. Two of his notable colleagues were the physical chemist Jacobus Henricus van 't Hoff and the biologist Hugo de Vries. Until his retirement at the age of 70, Van der Waals remained at the Amsterdam University. He was succeeded by his son Johannes Diderik van der Waals, Jr., who also was a theoretical physicist. In 1910, at the age of 72, Van der Waals was awarded the Nobel Prize in physics. He died at the age of 85 on March 8, 1923.

== Scientific work ==
The main interest of Van der Waals was in the field of thermodynamics. He was influenced by Rudolf Clausius's 1857 treatise entitled Über die Art der Bewegung, welche wir Wärme nennen (On the Kind of Motion which we Call Heat). Van der Waals was later greatly influenced by the writings of James Clerk Maxwell, Ludwig Boltzmann, and Willard Gibbs. Clausius's work led him to look for an explanation of Thomas Andrews's experiments that had revealed, in 1869, the existence of critical temperatures in fluids. He managed to give a semi-quantitative description of the phenomena of condensation and critical temperatures in his 1873 thesis, entitled Over de Continuïteit van den Gas- en Vloeistoftoestand (On the continuity of the gas and liquid state). This dissertation represented a hallmark in physics and was immediately recognized as such, e.g. by James Clerk Maxwell who reviewed it in Nature in a laudatory manner.

In this thesis he derived the equation of state bearing his name. This work gave a model in which the liquid and the gas phase of a substance merge into each other in a continuous manner. It shows that the two phases are of the same nature. In deriving his equation of state Van der Waals assumed not only the existence of molecules (the existence of atoms was disputed at the time), but also that they are of finite size and attract each other. Since he was one of the first to postulate an intermolecular force, however rudimentary, such a force is now sometimes called a Van der Waals force.

A second major discovery was the 1880 law of corresponding states, which showed that the Van der Waals equation of state can be expressed as a simple function of the critical pressure, critical volume, and critical temperature. This general form is applicable to all substances (see Van der Waals equation.) The compound-specific constants a and b in the original equation are replaced by universal (compound-independent) quantities. It was this law which served as a guide during experiments which ultimately led to the liquefaction of hydrogen by James Dewar in 1898 and of helium by Heike Kamerlingh Onnes in 1908.

In 1890, Van der Waals published a treatise on the Theory of Binary Solutions in the Archives Néerlandaises. By relating his equation of state with the second law of thermodynamics, in the form first proposed by Willard Gibbs, he was able to arrive at a graphical representation of his mathematical formulations in the form of a surface which he called Ψ (Psi) surface following Gibbs, who used the Greek letter Ψ for the free energy of a system with different phases in equilibrium.

Mention should also be made of Van der Waals's theory of capillarity, which in its basic form first appeared in 1893. In contrast to the mechanical perspective on the subject provided earlier by Pierre-Simon Laplace, Van der Waals took a thermodynamic approach. This was controversial at the time, since the existence of molecules and their permanent, rapid motion were not universally accepted before Jean Baptiste Perrin's experimental verification of Albert Einstein's theoretical explanation of Brownian motion.

=== Personal life ===
He married his wife Anna Magdalena Smit in 1865, and the couple had three daughters (Anne Madeleine, Jacqueline E. van der Waals, Johanna Diderica) and one son, the physicist Johannes Diderik van der Waals, Jr., who also worked at the University of Amsterdam. Jacqueline was a poet of some note. Van der Waals's nephew Peter van der Waals was a cabinet maker and a leading figure in the Sapperton, Gloucestershire school of the Arts and Crafts movement. His wife died of tuberculosis at 34 years old in 1881. After becoming a widower Van der Waals never remarried and was so shaken by the death of his wife that he did not publish anything for about a decade. He died in Amsterdam on March 8, 1923, one year after his daughter Jacqueline had died.

== Honours ==
Van der Waals received numerous honors and distinctions, besides winning the 1910 Nobel Prize in Physics. He was awarded an honorary doctorate of the University of Cambridge; was made Honorary Member of the Imperial Society of Naturalists of Moscow, the Royal Irish Academy, and the American Philosophical Society (1916); Corresponding Member of the Institut de France and the Royal Academy of Sciences of Berlin; Associate Member of the Royal Academy of Sciences of Belgium; and Foreign Member of the Chemical Society of London, the National Academy of Sciences of the United States (1913), and of the Accademia dei Lincei of Rome. Van der Waals became a member of the Royal Netherlands Academy of Arts and Sciences in 1875. From 1896 until 1912, he was secretary of this society. He was furthermore elected as Honorary Member of the Netherlands Chemical Society in 1912.

Minor planet 32893 van der Waals is named in his honor.

== Related quotes ==
There can be no doubt that the name of Van der Waals will soon be among the foremost in molecular science,

— James Clerk Maxwell's remarks in Nature magazine (1873).

It will be perfectly clear that in all my studies I was quite convinced of the real existence of molecules, that I never regarded them as a figment of my imagination, nor even as mere centres of force effects. I considered them to be the actual bodies, thus what we term "body" in daily speech ought better to be called "pseudo body". It is an aggregate of bodies and empty space. We do not know the nature of a molecule consisting of a single chemical atom. It would be premature to seek to answer this question but to admit this ignorance in no way impairs the belief in its real existence. When I began my studies I had the feeling that I was almost alone in holding that view. And when, as occurred already in my 1873 treatise, I determined their number in one gram-mol, their size and the nature of their action, I was strengthened in my opinion, yet still there often arose within me the question whether in the final analysis a molecule is a figment of the imagination and the entire molecular theory too. And now I do not think it any exaggeration to state that the real existence of molecules is universally assumed by physicists. Many of those who opposed it most have ultimately been won over, and my theory may have been a contributory factor. And precisely this, I feel, is a step forward. Anyone acquainted with the writings of Boltzmann and Willard Gibbs will admit that physicists carrying great authority believe that the complex phenomena of the heat theory can only be interpreted in this way. It is a great pleasure for me that an increasing number of younger physicists find the inspiration for their work in studies and contemplations of the molecular theory ...

— Johannes D. van der Waals's notes in Nobel Lecture, The equation of state for gases and liquids (12 December 1910).

== See also ==
- Van der Waals equation
- Van der Waals strain
- Van der Waals radius
- Van der Waals force
- Redlich–Kwong equation of state
- Peng–Robinson equation of state
