= Van der Waals constants (data page) =

Table of constants for a list of gases and volatile liquids

The following table lists the Van der Waals constants (from the Van der Waals equation) for a number of common gases and volatile liquids. These constants are generally calculated from the critical pressure $p_c$ and temperature $T_c$ using the formulas $a = \frac{27}{64} \frac{R^2 T_c^2}{p_c}$ and $b = \frac{RT_c}{8p_c}$.

To convert from $\mathrm{L^2bar/mol^2}$ to $\mathrm{L^2 kPa/mol^2}$, multiply by 100.
To convert from $\mathrm{L^2bar/mol^2}$ to $\mathrm{m^6 Pa/mol^2}$, divide by 10.
To convert from $\mathrm{L/mol}$ to $\mathrm{m^3/mol}$, divide by 1000.

Chemical	a (L^{2}bar/mol^{2})	b (L/mol)
Acetic acid	17.7098	0.1065
Acetic anhydride	20.158	0.1263
Acetone	16.02	0.1124
Acetonitrile	17.81	0.1168
Acetylene	4.516	0.0522
Ammonia	4.225	0.0371
Aniline	29.14	0.1486
Argon	1.355	0.03201
Benzene	18.24	0.1193
Bromobenzene	28.94	0.1539
Butane	14.66	0.1226
1-Butanol	20.94	0.1326
2-Butanone	19.97	0.1326
Carbon dioxide	3.6	0.04267
Carbon disulfide	11.77	0.07685
Carbon monoxide	1.505	0.0398500
Carbon tetrachloride	19.7483	0.1281
Chlorine	6.579	0.05622
Chlorobenzene	25.77	0.1453
Chloroethane	11.05	0.08651
Chloromethane	7.570	0.06483
Cyanogen	7.769	0.06901
Cyclohexane	23.11	0.1424
Cyclopropane	8.34	0.0747
Decane	52.74	0.3043
1-Decanol	59.51	0.3086
Diethyl ether	17.61	0.1344
Diethyl sulfide	19.00	0.1214
Dimethyl ether	8.180	0.07246
Dimethyl sulfide	13.04	0.09213
Dodecane	69.38	0.3758
1-Dodecanol	75.70	0.3750
Ethane	5.562	0.0638
Ethanethiol	11.39	0.08098
Ethanol	12.18	0.08407
Ethyl acetate	20.72	0.1412
Ethylamine	10.74	0.08409
Ethylene	4.612	0.0582
Fluorine	1.171	0.0290
Fluorobenzene	20.19	0.1286
Fluoromethane	4.692	0.05264
Freon	10.78	0.0998
Furan	12.74	0.0926
Germanium tetrachloride	22.90	0.1485
Helium	0.0346	0.0238
Heptane	31.06	0.2049
1-Heptanol	38.17	0.2150
Hexane	24.71	0.1735
1-Hexanol	31.79	0.1856
Hydrazine	8.46	0.0462
Hydrogen	0.2476	0.02661
Hydrogen bromide	4.510	0.04431
Hydrogen chloride	3.716	0.04081
Hydrogen cyanide	11.29	0.0881
Hydrogen fluoride	9.565	0.0739
Hydrogen iodide	6.309	0.0530
Hydrogen selenide	5.338	0.04637
Hydrogen sulfide	4.490	0.04287
Isobutane	13.32	0.1164
Iodobenzene	33.52	0.1656
Krypton	2.349	0.03978
Mercury	8.200	0.01696
Methane	2.283	0.04278
Methanol	9.649	0.06702
Methylamine	7.106	0.0588
Neon	0.2135	0.01709
Neopentane	17.17	0.1411
Nitric oxide	1.358	0.02789
Nitrogen	1.370	0.0387
Nitrogen dioxide	5.354	0.04424
Nitrogen trifluoride	3.58	0.0545
Nitrous oxide	3.832	0.04415
Octane	37.88	0.2374
1-Octanol	44.71	0.2442
Oxygen	1.382	0.03186
Ozone	3.570	0.0487
Pentane	19.26	0.146
1-Pentanol	25.88	0.1568
Phenol	22.93	0.1177
Phosphine	4.692	0.05156
Propane	8.779	0.08445
1-Propanol	16.26	0.1079
2-Propanol	15.82	0.1109
Propene	8.442	0.0824
Pyridine	19.77	0.1137
Pyrrole	18.82	0.1049
Radon	6.601	0.06239
Silane	4.377	0.05786
Silicon tetrafluoride	4.251	0.05571
Sulfur dioxide	6.803	0.05636
Sulfur hexafluoride	7.857	0.0879
Tetrachloromethane	20.01	0.1281
Tetrachlorosilane	20.96	0.1470
Tetrafluoroethylene	6.954	0.0809
Tetrafluoromethane	4.040	0.0633
Tetrafluorosilane	5.259	0.0724
Tetrahydrofuran	16.39	0.1082
Tin tetrachloride	27.27	0.1642
Thiophene	17.21	0.1058
Toluene	24.38	0.1463
1-1-1-Trichloroethane	20.15	0.1317
Trichloromethane	15.34	0.1019
Trifluoromethane	5.378	0.0640
Trimethylamine	13.37	0.1101
Water	5.536	0.03049
Xenon	4.250	0.05105

== Units ==
1 J·m^{3}/mol^{2} = 1 m^{6}·Pa/mol^{2} = 10 L^{2}·bar/mol^{2}

1 L^{2}atm/mol^{2} = 0.101325 J·m^{3}/mol^{2} = 0.101325 Pa·m^{6}/mol^{2}

1 dm^{3}/mol = 1 L/mol = 1 m^{3}/kmol = 0.001 m^{3}/mol (where kmol is kilomoles = 1000 moles)
