= Heike Kamerlingh Onnes =

Dutch physicist (1853–1926)

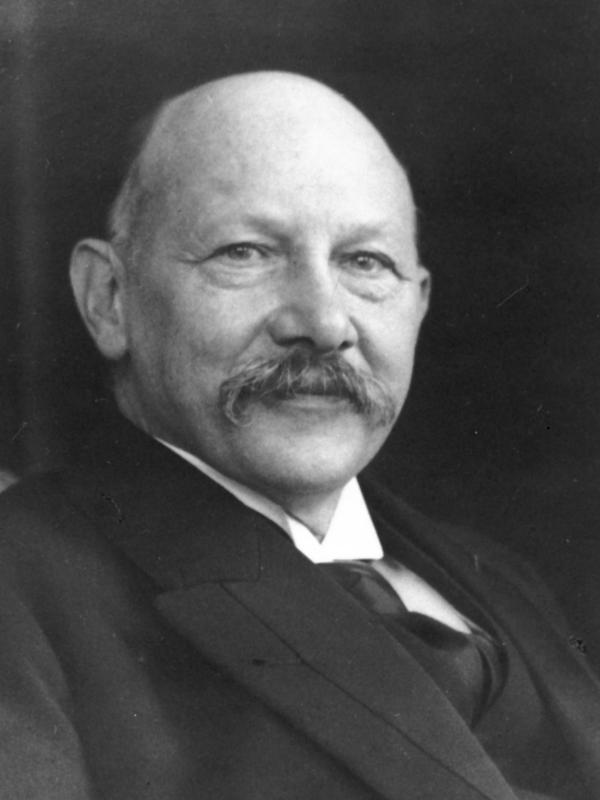
- Kamerlingh Onnes in 1913
- Born: 21 September 1853; Groningen, Netherlands
- Died: 21 February 1926 (aged 72); Leiden, Netherlands
- Education: University of Groningen: Candidate, Physics; Drs., Physics; Doctor, Physics; University of Heidelberg
- Known for: First liquefaction of helium; Discovery of superconductivity
- Spouse: Maria Bijleveld (m. 1887)
- Children: 1
- Relatives: Floris Verster (brother-in-law); Harm Kamerlingh Onnes (nephew)
- Awards: Matteucci Medal (1910); Rumford Medal (1912); Nobel Prize in Physics (1913); Franklin Medal (1915)
- Scientific career
- Fields: Physics
- Workplaces: Polytechnic School of Delft; Leiden University
- Thesis: Nieuwe bewijzen voor de aswenteling der aarde (1879)
- Doctoral advisor: Rudolf Adriaan Mees
- Doctoral students: Jacob Clay; Wander Johannes de Haas; Johannes Kuenen; Frans Penning; Pieter Zeeman

Heike Kamerlingh Onnes (Dutch: [ˈɦɛikə ˈkaːmərlɪŋ ˈɔnəs]; 21 September 1853 – 21 February 1926) was a Dutch experimental physicist who became the first to liquefy helium, cooling it to near 1.5 kelvin (K). For this work, he was awarded the Nobel Prize in Physics in 1913.

In 1911, using liquid helium to investigate the electrical conductivity of solid mercury, Kamerlingh Onnes found that its electrical resistance vanishes at 4.2 K, i.e. superconductivity.

== Biography ==
Heike Kamerlingh Onnes was born on 21 September 1853 in Groningen, Netherlands, the son of Anna Gerdina (née Coers) and Harm Kamerlingh Onnes, a brickworks owner. Kamerlingh Onnes's official surname was originally just "Onnes", while "Kamerlingh" was a second given name; his brother Onno's full birthname was "Onno Onnes". By persistently using "Kamerlingh Onnes" as if it was a double surname, Heike Kamerlingh Onnes succeeded in getting it entered as his surname in the official population registry.

In 1870, Kamerlingh Onnes entered the University of Groningen, graduating with a candidate degree in 1871. He then went to Germany, and studied under Robert Bunsen and Gustav Kirchhoff at the University of Heidelberg until 1873, when he returned to the University of Groningen in 1873 to complete his graduate studies. After passing the doctoraalexamen in 1878, he became an assistant at the Polytechnic School of Delft (now the Delft University of Technology) working under Johannes Bosscha, for whom he substituted in lectures in 1881 and 1882. He received a doctorate from Groningen in 1879 for a thesis on Earth's rotation.

In 1882, Kamerlingh Onnes was appointed Professor of Experimental Physics and Meteorology at Leiden University, where he remained until his retirement in 1923. In 1904, he founded a large cryogenics laboratory, and invited other researchers to the location, which made him highly regarded in the scientific community. The laboratory is now known as the Kamerlingh Onnes Laboratory.

Kamerlingh Onnes died on 21 February 1926 in Leiden at the age of 72.

== Research ==
=== Liquid helium ===
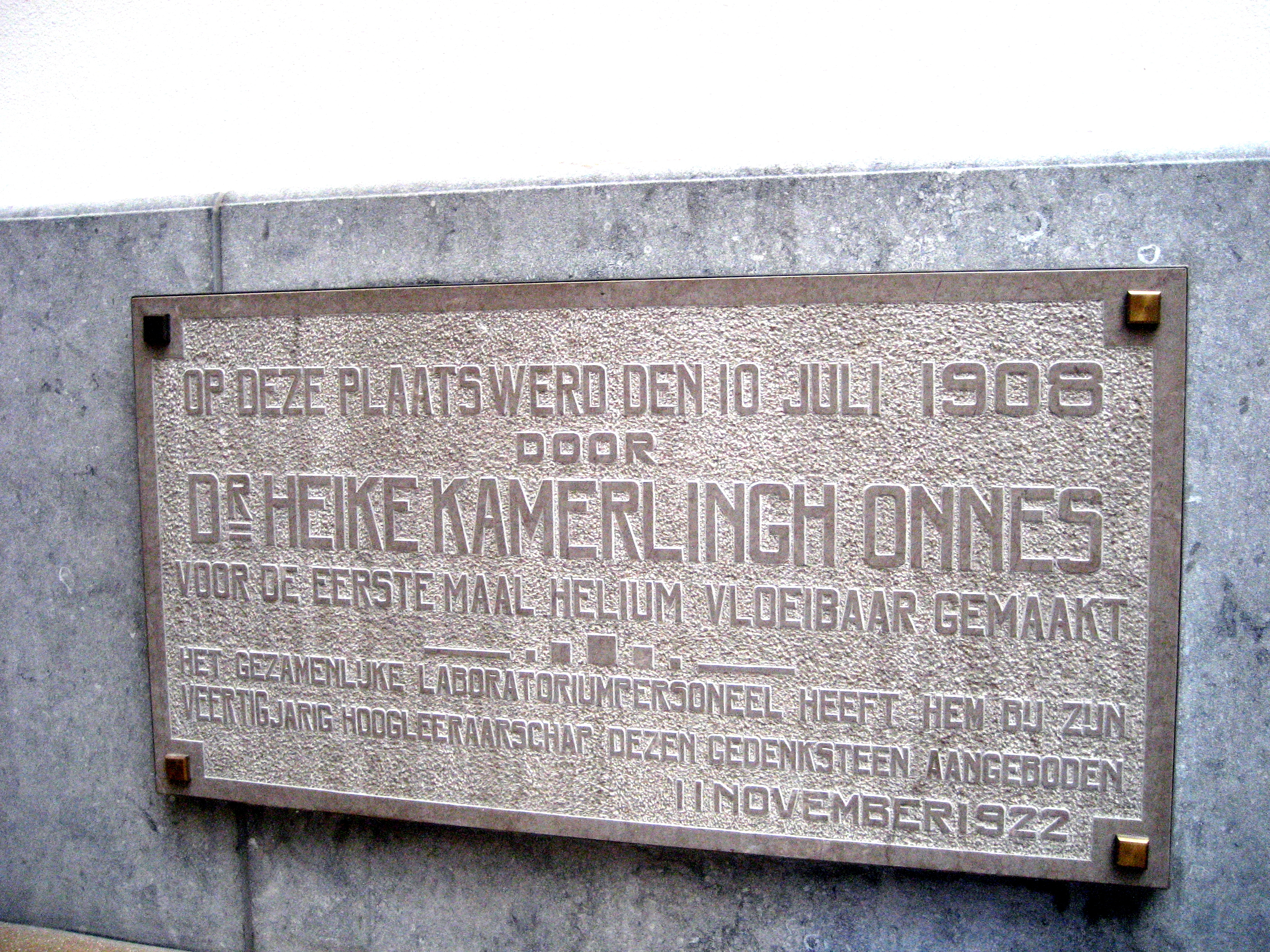
Commemorative plaque on the Kamerlingh Onnes Building in Leiden.

On 10 July 1908, Kamerlingh Onnes was the first to liquefy helium, using several pre-cooling stages and the Hampson–Linde cycle based on the Joule–Thomson effect. This way he lowered the temperature to the boiling point of helium (−269 °C, 4.2 K). By reducing the pressure of the liquid helium, he achieved a temperature near 1.5 K; this was the lowest temperature recorded on Earth at the time. The equipment employed is at the Museum Boerhaave in Leiden.

Kamerlingh Onnes received widespread recognition for this work, including the 1913 Nobel Prize in Physics "for his investigations on the properties of matter at low temperatures which led, inter alia, to the production of liquid helium."

For further research on low-temperature, Kamerlingh Onnes needed large amounts of helium. This he obtained in 1911 from Welsbach's company, which processed thorianite to produce thorium for gas mantles. Helium is produced as a side product. Previously, he obtained helium from processing monazite, and used the processed monazite (which still contained thorium) to trade for the helium. On Earth, helium is usually found in coexistence with radioactive material, since it is a product of radioactive decay.

=== Discovery of superconductivity ===
In 1911, Kamerlingh Onnes measured the electrical conductivity of pure metals (mercury, and later tin and lead) at very low temperatures. Some scientists, such as Lord Kelvin, believed that electrons flowing through a conductor would come to a complete halt or, in other words, metal resistivity would become infinitely large at absolute zero. Others, including Kamerlingh Onnes, felt that a conductor's electrical resistance would steadily decrease and drop to nil. Augustus Matthiessen said that when the temperature decreases, the metal conductivity usually improves or in other words, the electrical resistivity usually decreases with a decrease of temperature.

On 8 April 1911, Kamerlingh Onnes found that at 3.6 K the resistance in a solid mercury wire immersed in liquid helium suddenly vanished. He immediately realized the significance of the discovery (as became clear when his notebook was deciphered a century later). He reported that "Mercury has passed into a new state, which on account of its extraordinary electrical properties may be called the superconductive state." He published more articles about the phenomenon, initially referring to it as "supraconductivity," and later adopting the modern-day term "superconductivity." On the same day, he noted that "Just before the lowest temperature [about 1.8 K] was reached, the boiling suddenly stopped and was replaced by evaporation in which liquid visibly shrank" which was the first observation of superfluidity of the surrounding helium bath.

== Family ==
In 1887, Kamerlingh Onnes married Maria Adriana Wilhelmina Elisabeth Bijleveld, with whom he had one child, named Albert. His brother, Menso Kamerlingh Onnes (1860–1925), was a painter and the father of another painter, Harm Kamerlingh Onnes. Their sister, Jenny, married Floris Verster (1861–1927), also a painter.

== Recognition ==
=== Memberships ===
Year	Organization	Type	Ref.
1883	Royal Netherlands Academy of Arts and Sciences	Member	
1914	American Philosophical Society	International Member	
1916	Royal Society	Foreign Member	
1920	National Academy of Sciences	International Member	
1925	French Academy of Sciences	Foreign Associate	

=== Awards ===
Year	Organization	Award	Citation	Ref.
1910	Accademia dei XL	Matteucci Medal	—	
1912	Royal Society	Rumford Medal	"On the ground[s] of his researches at low temperatures."	
1913	Royal Swedish Academy of Sciences	Nobel Prize in Physics	"For his investigations on the properties of matter at low temperatures which led, inter alia, to the production of liquid helium."	
1915	Franklin Institute	Franklin Medal	—	

== Commemoration ==
Some of the instruments Kamerlingh Onnes devised for his experiments can be seen at the Boerhaave Museum in Leiden. The apparatus he used to first liquefy helium is on display in the lobby of the physics department at Leiden University, where the low-temperature lab is also named in his honor. His student and successor as director of the lab Willem Hendrik Keesom was the first person who was able to solidify helium, in 1926. The former Kamerlingh Onnes laboratory building is currently the Law Faculty at Leiden University and is known as "Kamerlingh Onnes Gebouw" (Kamerlingh Onnes Building), often shortened to "KOG". The current science faculty has a "Kamerlingh Onnes Laboratorium" named after him, as well as a plaque and several machines used by Kamerling Onnes in the main hall of the physics department.

The Kamerlingh Onnes Award (1948) and the Kamerlingh Onnes Prize (2000) were established in his honor, recognizing further advances in low-temperature science.

The Onnes effect referring to the creeping of superfluid helium is named in his honor.

Kamerlingh Onnes crater on the Moon is named after him.

Kamerlingh Onnes is credited with coining the term enthalpy.

Kamerlingh Onnes' discovery of superconductivity was named an IEEE Milestone in 2011.

== Selected publications ==
- Kamerlingh Onnes, H., "Nieuwe bewijzen voor de aswenteling der aarde." Ph.D. dissertation. Groningen, Netherlands, 1879.
- Kamerlingh Onnes, H., "Algemeene theorie der vloeistoffen." Amsterdam Akad. Verhandl; 21, 1881.
- Kamerlingh Onnes, H., "On the Cryogenic Laboratory at Leyden and on the Production of Very Low Temperature." Comm. Phys. Lab. Univ. Leiden; 14, 1894.
- Kamerlingh Onnes, H., "Théorie générale de l'état fluide." Haarlem Arch. Neerl.; 30, 1896.
- Kamerlingh Onnes, H., "Further experiments with liquid helium. C. On the change of electric resistance of pure metals at very low temperatures, etc. IV. The resistance of pure mercury at helium temperatures." Comm. Phys. Lab. Univ. Leiden; No. 120b, 1911.
- Kamerlingh Onnes, H., "Further experiments with liquid helium. D. On the change of electric resistance of pure metals at very low temperatures, etc. V. The disappearance of the resistance of mercury." Comm. Phys. Lab. Univ. Leiden; No. 122b, 1911.
- Kamerlingh Onnes, H., "Further experiments with liquid helium. G. On the electrical resistance of pure metals, etc. VI. On the sudden change in the rate at which the resistance of mercury disappears." Comm. Phys. Lab. Univ. Leiden; No. 124c, 1911.
- Kamerlingh Onnes, H., "On the Lowest Temperature Yet Obtained." Comm. Phys. Lab. Univ. Leiden; No. 159, 1922.

== See also ==
- Timeline of low-temperature technology
- Timeline of states of matter and phase transitions
- Coldest temperature achieved on earth
- List of Nobel laureates
- History of superconductivity
