= Fong =

Fong may refer to:

- the Bulu tribe of the Beti–Pahuin people of Cameroon
- various Chinese surnames
  - the Hong Kong Government Cantonese romanization of the surname Fāng (Chinese: 方)
  - the Taishanese pronunciation of the Chinese surname Kuàng (simplified Chinese: 邝; traditional Chinese: 鄺)
  - a Malaysian–Singaporean form of Féng (simplified Chinese: 冯; traditional Chinese: 馮
  - a Taiwanese form of Fèng (simplified Chinese: 凤; traditional Chinese: 鳳)

== List of people with the surname ==
- Allison Fong, American oceanographer
- Ching-Yao Fong, Chinese physicist
- Cory Fong (born 1972)

=== Unspecified ===
- Adam Fong (born 1980), California futuristic composer
- Alec Fong Lim (1931–1990)
- Angela Fong (born 1985)
- Craig Fong (born 1970)
- Danielle Fong (sport shooter) (born 1991)
- Danielle Fong (born 1987), co-founder and chief scientist of LightSail Energy
- Evan Fong (born 1992)
- Fong Chi Chung (born 1968)
- Fong Yee Pui (born 1991), Hong Kong sprinter
- Gary Fong (born 1960)
- Grace Fong
- Harold Michael Fong (1938–1995)
- Heather Fong (born 1956)
- Ivan K. Fong (born 1961)
- JJ Fong (born 1985 or 1986)
- Katrina Fong Lim (born 1961)
- Larry Fong (born 1960), American cinematographer
- Leo Fong (1928–2022)
- Les Fong (born 1956)
- Luise Fong (born 1964), Malaysian-born New Zealand artist
- Mei Fong
- Nathan Fong (1959–2020), Canadian chef
- Neale Fong
- Nickson Fong (born 1969)
- Peter Fong (born 1941), Fijian lawn bowler
- Robert Fong (born 1960)
- Sandra Fong (born 1990)
- Sunny Fong (born 1976)

=== 芳-方(Fāng) ===
- Adderly Fong (born 1990)
- Alex Fong (actor) (born 1963)
- Alex Fong (singer) (born 1980), professional swimmer-turned-actor and singer based in Hong Kong
- Allen Fong (born 1947)
- Ben Fong-Torres (born 1945)
- Dennis Fong (born 1977)
- Edsel Ford Fong (1927–1984)
- Fong Kui Lun (born 1946)
- Fong Pak Lun (born 1993)
- Fong Sai-yuk
- Fong Sai-yuk
- Hiram Fong (1906–2004), U.S. Senator from Hawaii (1959–1977)
- Kevin Fong (born 1971)
- Khalil Fong (1983–2025), soul music singer-songwriter signed to the Warner Music label in Hong Kong
- Lung Fong (1954–2008)
- Margaret Fong (born 1963)
- Matt Fong (1953–2011), California politician
- Mona Fong (1934–2017)
- Nellie Fong (born 1949)
- Paul Fong (born 1952), California politician
- Shirley Fong-Torres (1946–2011)

=== 鳳 (Fèng) ===
- Fong Fei-fei (1953–2012)

=== 冯 (Féng) ===
- Fong Chan Onn (born 1944)
- Fong Po Kuan (born 1973)

=== 邝 and 鄺 (Kuàng) ===
- Arthur Fong (born 1964)
- Benson Fong (1916–1987)
- Hiram Fong (1906–2004), American politician

== Other uses ==
- Dr Fong, a racehorse

== See also ==
- Fang (surname)
- Kuang (surname)
- Phong (disambiguation)
