= Redlich–Kwong equation of state =

Empirical algebraic equation of state more precise than the Van der Waals equation

In physics and thermodynamics, the Redlich–Kwong equation of state is an empirical algebraic equation that relates temperature, pressure, and volume of gases. It is generally more accurate than the van der Waals equation and the ideal gas equation at temperatures above the critical temperature. It was formulated by Otto Redlich and Joseph Neng Shun Kwong in 1949. It showed that a two-parameter, cubic equation of state could well reflect reality in many situations, standing alongside the much more complicated Beattie–Bridgeman model and Benedict–Webb–Rubin equation that were used at the time. Although it was initially developed for gases, the Redlich–Kwong equation has been considered the most modified equation of state since those modifications have been aimed to generalize the predictive results obtained from it. Although this equation is not currently employed in practical applications, modifications derived from this mathematical model like the Soave Redlich-Kwong (SRK), and Peng–Robinson have been improved and currently used in simulation and research of vapor–liquid equilibria.

== Equation ==
The Redlich–Kwong equation is formulated as:
$$p = \frac{R\,T}{V_m-b} - \frac{a}{\sqrt{T}\; V_m\, (V_m+b)},$$

where:

- p is the gas pressure
- R is the gas constant
- T is temperature
- V_{m} is the molar volume (V/n)
- a is a constant that corrects for attractive potential of molecules
- b is a constant that corrects for volume

The constants are different depending on which gas is being analyzed. The constants can be calculated from the critical point data of the gas:

$$\begin{align}
a &= \frac{1}{9(\sqrt[3]{2}-1)}\, \frac{R^2\, {T_c}^{2.5}}{P_c} = 0.42748\, \frac{R^2\, {T_c}^{2.5}}{P_c}, \\[1ex]
b &= \frac{\sqrt[3]{2}-1}{3}\, \frac{R\, T_c}{P_c} = 0.08664\, \frac{R\, T_c}{P_c},
\end{align}$$

where:

- T_{c} is the temperature at the critical point, and
- P_{c} is the pressure at the critical point.

The Redlich–Kwong equation can also be represented as an equation for the compressibility factor of gas, as a function of temperature and pressure:

$$Z = \frac{p\, V_m}{R\, T} = \frac{1}{1-h}\ - \frac{A^2}{B} \frac{h}{1+h}$$

where:

- $A^2 = \frac{a}{R^2\, T^{5/2}} = \frac{0.42748\, {T_c}^{5/2}}{P_c\, T^{5/2}}$
- $B = \frac{b}{R\, T} = \frac{0.08664\, T_c}{P_c\, T}$
- $h = \frac{B\, p}{Z} = \frac{b}{V_m}$

Or more simply:
$$Z=\frac{p V_m}{RT} = \frac{V_m}{V_m - b} - \frac{a}{R T^{3/2} \left(V_m + b\right)}$$

This equation only implicitly gives Z as a function of pressure and temperature, but is easily solved numerically, originally by graphical interpolation, and now more easily by computer. Moreover, analytic solutions to cubic functions have been known for centuries and are even faster for computers. The Redlich-Kwong equation of state may also be expressed as a cubic function of the molar volume.

For all Redlich–Kwong gases:

$$Z_c = \frac{1}{3}$$

where:

- Z_{c} is the compressibility factor at the critical point

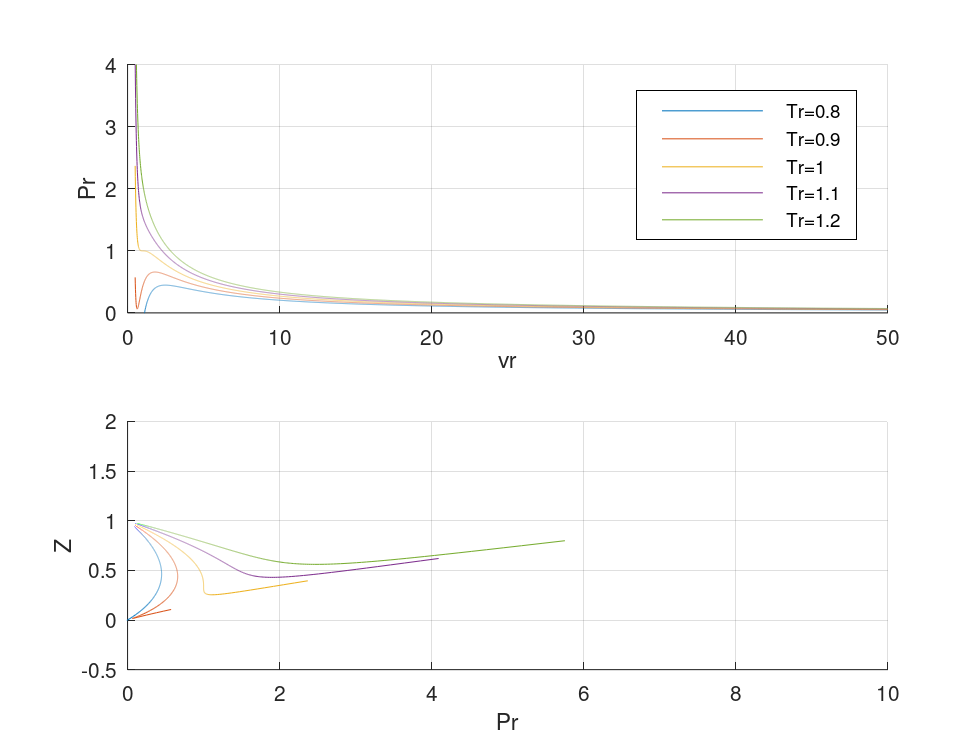
Redlich-Kwong graph of Pr(Vr) and Z(Pr) at constant Tr.

Using $p_r = p / P_\text{c}$, $V_r = V_\text{m} / V_\text{m,c}$, $T_r = T / T_\text{c}$ the equation of state can be written in the reduced form:

$$p_r = \frac{Z_c^{-1}T_r}{V_r-0.08664Z_c^{-1}}-\frac{0.42748Z_c^{-2}}{\sqrt{T_r} V_r \left(V_r + {0.08664} Z_c^{-1}\right)}$$

And since $Z_c^{-1} = 3$ it follows:
$$p_r = \frac{3 T_r}{V_r-b'} - \frac{1}{b'\sqrt{T_r}V_r\left(V_r+b'\right)}$$
with $b'=\sqrt[3]{2}-1 \approx 0.26$

From the Redlich–Kwong equation, the fugacity coefficient of a gas can be estimated:

$$\ln \phi = \int_0^P {\frac{Z - 1}{p} dP} = Z - 1 - \ln\left(Z - B \, P\right) - \frac{A^2}{B}\, \ln \left(1+\frac{B\, P}{Z}\right)$$

=== Critical constants ===
It is possible to express the critical constants T_{c} and P_{c} as functions of a and b by reversing the following system of 2 equations a(T_{c}, P_{c}) and b(T_{c}, P_{c}) with 2 variables T_{c}, P_{c}:

$$\begin{align}
a &= \frac{1}{9(\sqrt[3]{2}-1)}\, \frac{R^2\, {T_c}^{5/2}}{P_c} = \frac{1}{9(\sqrt[3]{2}-1)}\, \frac{R^2\, {T_c}^{5/2}}{\frac{\sqrt[3]{2}-1}{3}\, \frac{R\, T_c}{b}} \\[1ex]
\implies a &= \frac{b R\, {T_c}^{3/2}}{3{\left(\sqrt[3]{2} - 1\right)}^2} \\[1ex]
\implies T_c &= 3^{2/3} {\left(\sqrt[3]{2} - 1\right)}^{4/3} {\left(\frac{a}{bR}\right)}^{2/3}
\end{align}$$
$$\begin{align}
b &= \frac{\sqrt[3]{2}-1}{3}\, \frac{R\, T_c}{P_c} \\[1ex]
\implies P_c &= \frac{\sqrt[3]{2}-1}{3}\, \frac{R\, T_c}{b} \\[1ex]
\implies P_c &= \frac{(\sqrt[3]{2}-1)^{7/3}}{3^{1/3}}R^{1/3}\frac{a^{2/3}}{b^{5/3}}
\end{align}$$

Because of the definition of compressibility factor at critical condition, it is possible to reverse it to find the critical molar volume V_{m,c}, by knowing previous found P_{c}, T_{c} and Z_{c}=1/3.

$$Z=\frac{PV_m}{RT}
\implies Z_c=\frac{P_c V_{m,c}}{RT_c}
\implies V_{m,c} = Z_c \frac{R T_c}{P_c}$$

$$V_{m,c} = \frac{R}{3} \frac{3^{2/3} (\sqrt[3]{2}-1)^{4/3} (\frac{a}{bR})^{2/3}}{\frac{(\sqrt[3]{2}-1)^{7/3}}{3^{1/3}}R^{1/3}\frac{a^{2/3}}{b^{5/3}}} = \frac{R}{3} \frac{3b}{R(\sqrt[3]{2}-1)} = \frac{b}{\sqrt[3]{2}-1}$$

=== Multiple components ===
The Redlich–Kwong equation was developed with an intent to also be applicable to mixtures of gases. In a mixture, the b term, representing the volume of the molecules, is an average of the b values of the components, weighted by the mole fractions:

$$b = \sum_i \sum_j x_i\, x_j b_{ij},$$
or
$$B = \sum_i x_i\, B_i$$

where:

- x_{i} is the mole fraction of the i^{th} component of the mixture,
- b_{ij} is the covolume parameter of the i-j pair in the mixture, and
- B_{i} is the B value of the i^{th} component of the mixture

The cross-terms of b_{ij} (i.e. terms for which $i \neq j$), are commonly computed as

$$b_{ij} =\frac{b_i + b_j}{2}(1 - l_{ij}),$$

where $l_{ij}$ is an often empirically fitted interaction parameter accounting for asymmetry in the cross interactions.

The constant representing the attractive forces, a, is not linear with respect to mole fraction, but rather depends on the square of the mole fractions. That is:

$$a = \sum_i \sum_j x_i\, x_j\, a_{i\, j}$$

where:

- a_{i j} is the attractive term between a molecule of species i and species j,
- x_{i} is the mole fraction of the i^{th} component of the mixture, and
- x_{j} is the mole fraction of the j^{th} component of the mixture.

It is generally assumed that the attractive cross terms represent the geometric average of the individual a terms, adjusted using an interaction parameter $k_{ij}$, that is:

$$a_{i\, j} = (a_i\, a_j)^{1/2}(1 - k_{ij}),$$

Where the interaction parameter $k_{ij}$ is an often empirically fitted parameter accounting for asymmetry in the molecular cross-interactions. In this case, the following equation for the attractive term is furnished:

$$A = \sum_i x_i\, A_i$$

where A_{i} is the A term for the i'th component of the mixture.

These manners of creating a and b parameters for a mixture from the parameters of the pure fluids are commonly known as the van der Waals one-fluid mixing and combining rules.

== History ==
The Van der Waals equation, formulated in 1873 by Johannes Diderik van der Waals, is generally regarded as the first somewhat realistic equation of state (beyond the ideal gas law):

$$p = \frac{RT}{V_\mathrm{m}-b}-\frac{a}{V_\mathrm{m}^2}$$

However, its modeling of real behavior is not sufficient for many applications, and by 1949, had fallen out of favor, with the Beattie–Bridgeman and Benedict–Webb–Rubin equations of state being used preferentially, both of which contain more parameters than the Van der Waals equation. The Redlich–Kwong equation was developed by Redlich and Kwong while they were both working for the Shell Development Company at Emeryville, California. Kwong had begun working at Shell in 1944, where he met Otto Redlich when he joined the group in 1945. The equation arose out of their work at Shell - they wanted an easy, algebraic way to relate the pressures, volumes, and temperatures of the gasses they were working with - mostly non-polar and slightly polar hydrocarbons (the Redlich–Kwong equation is less accurate for hydrogen-bonding gases). It was presented jointly in Portland, Oregon at the Symposium on Thermodynamics and Molecular Structure of Solutions in 1948, as part of the 14th Meeting of the American Chemical Society. The success of the Redlich–Kwong equation in modeling many real gases accurately demonstrate that a cubic, two-parameter equation of state can give adequate results, if it is properly constructed. After they demonstrated the viability of such equations, many others created equations of similar form to try to improve on the results of Redlich and Kwong.

== Derivation ==
The equation is essentially empirical – the derivation is neither direct nor rigorous. The Redlich–Kwong equation is very similar to the Van der Waals equation, with only a slight modification being made to the attractive term, giving that term a temperature dependence. At high pressures, the volume of all gases approaches some finite volume, largely independent of temperature, that is related to the size of the gas molecules. This volume is reflected in the b in the equation. It is empirically true that this volume is about 0.26V_{c} (where V_{c} is the volume at the critical point). This approximation is quite good for many small, non-polar compounds – the value ranges between about 0.24V_{c} and 0.28V_{c}. In order for the equation to provide a good approximation of volume at high pressures, it had to be constructed such that

$$b = 0.26\ V_c.$$

The first term in the equation represents this high-pressure behavior.

The second term corrects for the attractive force of the molecules to each other. The functional form of a with respect to the critical temperature and pressure is empirically chosen to give the best fit at moderate pressures for most relatively non-polar gasses.

=== In reality ===
The values of a and b are completely determined by the equation's shape and cannot be empirically chosen. Requiring it to hold at its critical point $P = P_c$, $V = V_c$,

$$P_c = \frac{R\,T_c}{V_c-b} - \frac{a}{\sqrt{T_c}\;V_c\,(V_c+b)},$$

enforcing the thermodynamic criteria for a critical point,

$$\left(\frac{\partial P}{\partial V}\right)_T  = 0, \left(\frac{\partial^2 P}{\partial V^2}\right)_T=0,$$

and without loss of generality defining $b = b' V_c$ and $V_c = Z_c R T_c/P_c$ yields 3 constraints,

$$\begin{align}
a &= \frac{(1+b')^2}{(b'-1)^2(2+b')} \frac{R^2 T_c^{5/2} Z_c}{P_c} \\[2pt]
a &= \frac{(1+b')^3}{(1-b')^3(3+3b'+b'^2)} \frac{R^2 T_c^{5/2} Z_c}{P_c} \\[2pt]
a &= \frac{(1+b')(1-Z_c+b' Z_c)}{b'-1} \frac{R^2 T_c^{5/2} Z_c}{P_c}.
\end{align}$$

Simultaneously solving these while requiring b' and Z_{c} to be positive yields only one solution:

$$\begin{align}
Z_c &= \frac{1}{3}, \qquad \qquad
b'= \sqrt[3]{2}-1, \\[1ex]
a &= \frac{P_c V_c^2 \sqrt{T_c}}{b'}
= \frac{1}{\sqrt[3]{2}-1}\, \frac{R^2\, {T_c}^{5/2}}{9 P_c}.
\end{align}$$

== Modification ==
The Redlich–Kwong equation was designed largely to predict the properties of small, non-polar molecules in the vapor phase, which it generally does well. However, it has been subject to various attempts to refine and improve it. In 1975, Redlich himself published an equation of state adding a third parameter, in order to better model the behavior of both long-chained molecules, as well as more polar molecules. His 1975 equation was not so much a modification to the original equation as a re-inventing of a new equation of state, and was also formulated so as to take advantage of computer calculation, which was not available at the time the original equation was published. Many others have offered competing equations of state, either modifications to the original equation, or equations quite different in form. It was recognized by the mid 1960s that to significantly improve the equation, the parameters, especially a, would need to become temperature dependent. As early as 1966, Barner noted that the Redlich–Kwong equation worked best for molecules with an acentric factor (ω) close to zero. He therefore proposed a modification to the attractive term:

$$a = \alpha + \gamma\,T^{-1.5}$$

where

- α is the attractive term in the original Redlich–Kwong equation
- γ is a parameter related to ω, with γ = 0 for ω = 0

It soon became desirable to obtain an equation that would also model well the Vapor–liquid equilibrium (VLE) properties of fluids, in addition to the vapor-phase properties. Perhaps the best known application of the Redlich–Kwong equation was in calculating gas fugacities of hydrocarbon mixtures, which it does well, that was then used in the VLE model developed by Chao and Seader in 1961. However, in order for the Redlich–Kwong equation to stand on its own in modeling vapor–liquid equilibria, more substantial modifications needed to be made. The most successful of these modifications is the Soave modification to the equation, proposed in 1972. Soave's modification involved replacing the T^{1/2} power found in the denominator attractive term of the original equation with a more complicated temperature-dependent expression. He presented the equation as follows:

$$P = \frac{R\,T}{V_m-b} - \frac{a\,\alpha}{V_m(V_m+b)}$$

where

- $\alpha = \left(1 + (0.480 + 1.574\,\omega - 0.176\,\omega^2) (1-\sqrt{T_r})\right)^2,$
- $a = \frac{1}{9(\sqrt[3]{2}-1)}\, \frac{R^2\, {T_c}^2}{P_c} = 0.42748\, \frac{R^2\, {T_c}^2}{P_c},$
- $b = \frac{\sqrt[3]{2} - 1}{3}\, \frac{R\, T_c}{P_c} = 0.08664\, \frac{R\, T_c}{P_c},$
- T_{r} is the reduced temperature of the compound, and
- ω is the acentric factor

The Peng–Robinson equation of state further modified the Redlich–Kwong equation by modifying the attractive term, giving

$$p = \frac{R\,T}{V_m-b} - \frac{a\,\alpha}{V_m\, (V_m + b) + b\, (V_m - b)}$$

the parameters a, b, and α are slightly modified, with

$$\begin{align}
a &= \frac{0.457235\,R^2\,T_c^2}{p_c} \\
b &= \frac{0.077796\,R\,T_c}{p_c} \\
\alpha &= \left(1 + (0.37464 + 1.54226\omega - 0.26992\omega^2) (1-\sqrt{T_r})\right)^2
\end{align}$$

The Peng–Robinson equation typically gives similar VLE equilibria properties as the Soave modification, but often gives better estimations of the liquid phase density.

Several modifications have been made that attempt to more accurately represent the first term, related to the molecular size. The first significant modification of the repulsive term beyond the Van der Waals equation's

$$P_\text{hs} = \frac{R\, T}{V_m - b} = \frac{R\, T}{V_m}\, \frac{1}{1 - \frac{b}{V_m}}$$

(where P_{hs} represents a hard spheres equation of state term.) was developed in 1963 by Thiele:

$$P_\text{hs}= \frac{R\, T}{V_m}\, \frac{1 - \eta^3}{(1 - \eta)^4}$$

where
$$\eta = \frac{b}{4\, V_m}.$$

This expression was improved by Carnahan and Starling to give

$$P_\text{hs}= \frac{R\, T}{V_m}\, \frac{1 + \eta + \eta^2 - \eta^3}{{\left(1 - \eta\right)}^3}$$

The Carnahan-Starling hard-sphere equation of state has term been used extensively in developing other equations of state, and tends to give very good approximations for the repulsive term.

Beyond improved two-parameter equations of state, a number of three parameter equations have been developed, often with the third parameter depending on either Z_{c}, the compressibility factor at the critical point, or ω, the acentric factor. Schmidt and Wenzel proposed an equation of state with an attractive term that incorporates the acentric factor:

$$P = \frac{R\, T}{V_m - b} - \frac{a}{V_m^2 + (1 + 3\, \omega) b V_m - 3\omega b^2}$$

This equation reduces to the original Redlich–Kwong equation in the case when ω = 0, and to the Peng–Robinson equation when ω = 1/3.

== See also ==
- Gas laws
- Ideal gas
- Inversion temperature
- Iteration
- Maxwell construction
- Real gas
- Theorem of corresponding states
- Van der Waals equation
