= Yuman Fong =

American surgeon

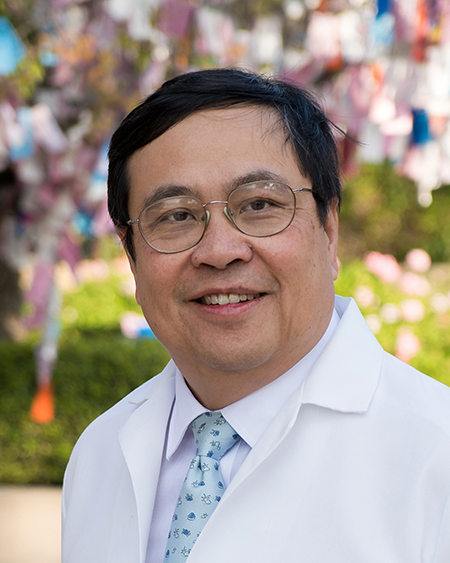
- Born: Kowloon, Hong Kong
- Education: Brown University
- Known for: Liver and Pancreatic Surgery, Surgical Robotics, Gene Therapy
- Children: Sandra Fong; Danielle Fong; Abigail Fong
- Awards: Member, National Academy of Medicine (2021)
- Scientific career
- Fields: Hepatobiliary Surgery, Immunotherapy of Cancer
- Institutions: City of Hope National Medical Center; Memorial Sloan Kettering Cancer Center; Weill Cornell Medical College

Yuman Fong is an American surgeon and scientist specializing in surgical oncology and hepatobiliary surgery. He serves as Chair of the Department of Surgery at the City of Hope National Medical Center, where he holds the Sangiacomo Family Chair in Surgical Oncology.

Fong's research has focused on immune activation in cancer and infectious disease, cancer gene therapy, biologics manufacturing, and the surgical treatment of colorectal cancer metastatic to the liver. He has also contributed to the development of robotic and remote surgical techniques. In 2021, he was elected a member of the National Academy of Medicine.

== Early life and education ==
Yuman Fong was born in Kowloon, Hong Kong. In 1969, he emigrated with his parents to San Francisco, California. He attended Sherman Elementary School, Herbert Hoover Junior High School, and graduated from Lowell High School in 1977.

Fong received a Bachelor of Arts in medieval literature from Brown University in 1981. He earned a Doctor of Medicine (M.D.) degree from Cornell University Medical College in 1984.

The Society of Asian Academic Surgeons established the Kui and Wai Fong Lectureship in honor of his parents.

== Academic career ==
Fong was appointed an assistant professor to the faculty at Memorial Sloan-Kettering Cancer Center in 1993 with an academic appointment at Weill Cornell Medical Center. In 2000 he was promoted from assistant to full professor with tenure at Cornell University. For over twenty years, he was an attending surgeon at the Memorial Sloan-Kettering Cancer Center (MSKCC), where he held the Murray F. Brennan Chair in Surgery.

In 2014, he left New York to return to California. He was appointed Chairman of the Department of Surgery at the City of Hope Medical Center. There he held the Sangiacomo Family Chair in Surgical Oncology, named for Angelo and Yvonne Sangiacomo

== Research and contributions ==
Fong's early research examined immune activation in cancer and infectious disease. His laboratory research includes work in cancer gene therapy and in the development of cell culture systems for the production of biologics. His group has reported on bioreactor technologies intended to improve the manufacturing efficiency of gene therapy vectors and related therapeutics.

His clinical research has focused on hepatobiliary surgery, including studies of surgical management for colorectal cancer metastatic to the liver. He has also contributed to the development and evaluation of robotic surgical techniques for cancer treatment and has participated in research on remote robotic surgery, including simulated procedures involving a robotic system on the International Space Station.

Fong has co-authored more than 1,000 scientific articles and 17 textbooks. In 2019, PLOS Biology included him in a standardized citation metrics database of highly cited researchers. He has also been listed among the top 1,000 most-cited researchers based on Google Scholar public profiles. A bibliometric analysis published in Annals of Surgery identified one of his publications as the most cited paper in the history of the American Surgical Association.

He chaired National Institutes of Health workshops on nucleotide therapies (2012) and gene therapy, Charting a Future Course (2013). He later served as Chair of the Recombinant DNA Advisory Committee (RAC) of the National Institutes of Health.

Fong is the founding Editor-in-Chief of Molecular Therapy Oncology, published by Cell Press in association with the American Society of Gene and Cell Therapy. He is a member of the American Institute for Medical and Biological Engineering.

He has served as editor of the Springer textbooks Image-guided Therapies and The SAGES Atlas in Robotic Surgery.

== Honors and awards ==
- Stanley Dudrick Research Scholar Prize by American Society for Parenteral and Enteral Nutrition, 1994
- Arthur M. Shipley Award, Southern Surgical Association, 2002
- Election, American Society for Clinical Investigation, 2003
- Honorary Doctor of Science (DSc), King George's Medical University, 2016
- Election, American Institute for Medical and Biological Engineering (AIMBE), 2018
- Layton F. Rikkers Master Clinician Award, Society for Surgery of the Alimentary Tract, 2019
- Elected Member, National Academy of Medicine, 2021
- Flance-Karl Award by the American Surgical Association, 2022
- Honorary Doctorate, Elmezzi Graduate School of Molecular Medicine, Northwell Health and the Feinstein Institutes for Medical Research, 2022

== Books ==
- Blumgart LH, Fong Y. Surgery of the liver and biliary tract. Churchill Livingstone: London, CD-ROM ed: 1.1, 1997.
- Clavien P, Fong Y, Lyerly K, Venook A. Primary and Secondary Liver Tumors: Current and Emerging Therapies. Blackwell Science Inc.: Malden MA, 1999.
- Blumgart LH, Fong Y. Surgery of the liver and biliary tract. W.B. Saunders Co. Ltd.: London, 3rd Edition, 2000.
- Blumgart LH, Fong Y, Jarnagin W. Hepatobiliary Cancer. American Cancer Society Atlas of Clinical Oncology. B.C.Decker, Hamilton, 2000.
- Moorse M, Clavien P, Fong Y. Malignant Hepatic Neoplasms. Blackwell Science Inc.: Malden MA. 2002.
- Clavien P, Sarr M, Fong Y. Atlas of Gastrointestinal and Hepato-Pancreatobiliary Surgery. Springer: Munich, 2007.
- Jankowski J, Sampliner R, Kerr D, Fong Y. Gastrointestinal Oncology: A Critical Multidisciplinary Team Approach. Blackwell Publishing: Oxford, 2007.
- Dupuy D, Fong Y, McMullen W. Interventional Oncology. Springer, 2013.
- Fong Y, Dong D. Hepatobiliary Cancer. People's Publishing USA, 2014.
- Fong Y, Agarwal A. Gallbladder Cancer. 2014.
- Fong Y, Giulianotti PC, Lewis J, Groot Koerkamp B. The Modern Operating Room: Changing Role of Imaging and Visualization in Surgery. Springer, 2014.
- Fong Y, Kaufmann R, Marchinkowski E, Singh G, Schoelhammer H. Surgical Emergencies in the Cancer Patient, Springer, 2017.
- Clavien P, Sarr M, Fong Y. Atlas of Gastrointestinal and Hepato-Pancreatobiliary Surgery. Springer: Munich, 2007.
- Clavien P, Sarr M, Fong Y, Myazaki M. Atlas of Gastrointestinal and Hepato-Pancreatobiliary Surgery. 2nd Edition. Springer: Munich, 20014.
- Fong Y, Woo Y, Lau C, Hyung H, Strong V. SAGES Atlas of Robotic Surgery, Springer 2018.
- Fong Y, Brownstein M. Multimodality Heros Versus Neoplasm: The Battle for Homeostadt- A Graphic Novel. 2019.
- Fong Y, Gamblin TC, Zager J, Han E, Lee B. Textbook of Cancer Regional Therapy: HAI, HIPEC, ILI, HILP, ITH, PIPAC, and Beyond. Springer 2020.

== Personal life ==
Fong has participated in competitive sports and was a medalist at the Empire State Games.

He has coached his daughters, Sandra Fong, Danielle Fong, and Abigail Fong in competitive shooting, including at the 2008 Beijing Olympic Games, the 2008 Summer Paralympics, and multiple world championships.

Abigail Fong is a six-time national champion and a member of the United States national team.
