= Kuang (surname) =

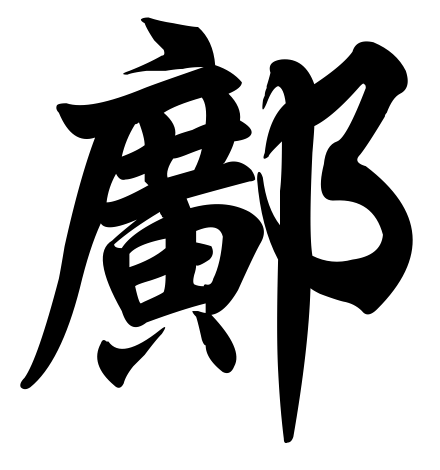
- Kuang surname in traditional Chinese
- Pronunciation: Kuàng (Pinyin)
- Language: Chinese

Origin
- Origin: Central Plains China, Henan province
- Derivation: State of Kuang

Other names
- Variant forms: Kwong, Kuong, Kwang, Quong, Kong, Khong; Toisan: Fong, Fhon
- See also: Lei

Kuang (traditional Chinese: 鄺; simplified Chinese: 邝; pinyin: kuàng; Wade–Giles: k'uang; Jyutping: Kwong3) is a Chinese surname that originated from central China. Although Kuang is not amongst the 100 most common Chinese surnames, it is common amongst the Chinese diaspora in Hong Kong, Macau, Malaysia, Singapore, Vietnam, Philippines, United States, United Kingdom, Canada, Australia, Fiji, Thailand, Peru, Cuba, Burma, Indonesia and Reunion Island.

== Origin ==
Since the Han dynasty, the Kuang family had a prominent role in the Han aristocracy. Several high generals and commissioners were from the Kuang clan. The last recorded Kuang aristocracy was of the Ming dynasty.

Since the collapse of the Han dynasty and the start of an era of political unrest, during the Three Kingdoms period in 220 CE, several members of the Kuang clan migrated south in pursuit of a brighter future for their descendants in more fertile and peaceful lands.

== Variations ==
Variations of the surname Kwong are also common. These include different spellings of the English term and versions from other countries and cultures. In the overseas communities, those with the spelling Kwong trace their origins to families who have emigrated overseas before the 1970s when mainland China reformed its romanisation system, adjusting the surname spelling to Kuàng. Hong Kong residents continue to use the spelling Kwong along with most overseas Chinese communities, especially those that emigrated before the 1970s.

Alternatively, since the majority of Kwongs trace their origins to Toishan and Panyu, both coastal counties in Kwangtung province, many Kwongs pronounce the name Fong, in accordance with the pronunciation of the local dialect.

In addition, at the beginning of the 20th century, when many new Chinese immigrants were entering the U.S., those filling out ships' manifests sometimes spelled it in a variety of ways, including Kuàng, Kuang, Kong, Kwang, Kuong, Kwong, and Fong. In Australia, the surname can be spelled as Quong. In Peru, the surname can be spelled Fohn or Fong.

In Trujillo, Peru, the surname Fhon comes from Panyu. The surname of a man named 鄺其莊 who emigrated to Peru in the early 1900s was translated by a Chinese consulate member in Lima, Peru, to Aurelio Kin Chong Fhon at his arrival from China, with Aurelio probably picked by the man. His mother's maiden name was Huayno (Ou-Yang 歐陽) also from Panyu, Kwangtung province. The surname Fhon started in Trujillo and nowadays they can be found in many regions of the American continent, including the United States of America.

== Family motto ==
The Kuang clan ancestral ritual motto (traditional Chinese: 鄺姓宗祠通用對聯; simplified Chinese: 邝姓宗祠通用对联; pinyin: kùang xìng zōngcí tōngyòng duìlían; Wade–Giles: k'uang sheng tsungch'h t'ungyung tuiliehn) is "One origin evolved into three ancestries" (traditional Chinese: 源同一脈；衍以三宗; simplified Chinese: 源同一脉；衍以三宗; pinyin: yuán tóngyī mài; yǎn yǐ sān zōng)

This motto reflects the unique familial history of the Kuang's, as the Kuang, the Lei, and the Fang families all evolved from a common ancestor.

The Kuang clan ancestral seven-character motto (traditional Chinese: 鄺姓宗祠七言通用聯; simplified Chinese: 邝姓宗祠七言通用联; pinyin: kùang xìng zōngcí qīyán tōngyòng lían; Wade–Giles: k'uang sheng tsungch'h ch'ihyan t'ungyung liehn) is

"the official dies in Haixue Hall; the warrior dies in defense of the fort" (traditional Chinese: 海雪堂遺臣死節； 土木堡兵部殉忠; simplified Chinese: 海雪堂遗臣死节； 土木堡兵部殉忠; pinyin: Hǎixuě Táng yíchén sǐjié; Tǔmù Bǔ bīngbù xùnzhōng

The motto commemorates two of the greatest Ming dynasty officials in the family. The first line records Kuang Lu (鄺露)'s suicide in Haixue Hall in the face of invading Manchurian rebels and memorializes his loyalty to the country and the emperor. And the second line tells Kuang Ye (鄺埜)'s death in the defense of a southern Ming city against Mongol invasion and reminds people of the exemplar's loyalty and valor.

== Dispersion ==
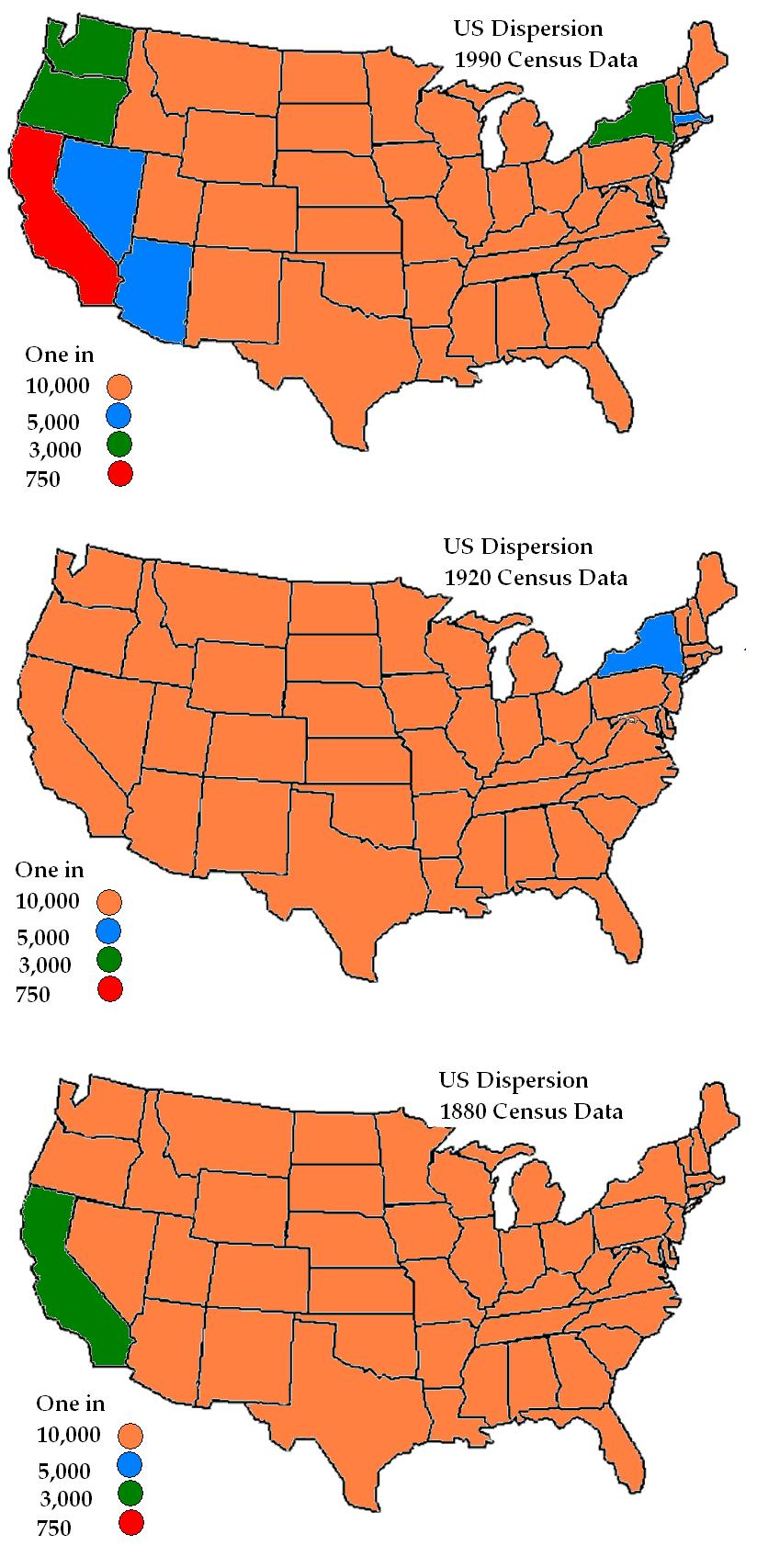
Dispersion of the Kwong last name in the United States since 1880, source: US Census Bureau

=== Early dispersion in Guangdong Province ===
According to the Chinese classical text Sheng Yuan (姓苑), "Many in Guangdong's Nanhai County bears the Kuang surname."

The fourth son of Yiping, Kuang Zhun (邝谆) had three sons. Ordered by their father to disperse and spread the family name, the second son of Kuang Zhun, Kuang Yizheng (邝一声) migrated to Kukang in Xinhua County, Guangdong where he became the ancestor of the Xinhua, Kaiping, and Taishan lineage of the Kuang family. Zhun's third son, Kuang Yijun (一俊), returned to the original home of the Kuang family in Guangdong, located in Dazhan, Nanhai County, Guangdong.

=== Dispersion in Taishan County, Guangdong ===
During the reign of Emperor Lihong of the Song dynasty, Kuang Xing (邝兴, style name Gong Biao 公表), the fourth-generation ancestor of the Kuang clan in Guangdong, migrated from Pan Village, Kaiping County to Chengyun Village, Zhongxin Village, Xining County, now known as Zhongxin Village, Chengyun Administrative District, Sanba Village, Taishan Municipality, and became the ancestor of the Kuang clan in Taishan, the largest today in mainland China. Since the founding of Huaxing's Taishan-based ancestral branch, over 30 generations of Kuang's have taken root in Chengyun Village, with a total of 13,835 individuals dispersed in 12 towns and 154 villages sharing the surname in Taishan alone according to municipal statistics.

=== Dispersion overseas ===
Originating from mainland China, there are over 5 million Kuang's today (including variations), dispersed mostly in China and in the ethnic Chinese communities in Malaysia, Singapore, Vietnam, Philippines, United States, United Kingdom, Canada, Australia, Fiji, Thailand, Cuba, Burma, Indonesia.

In the United States, 0.001% of the population has the last name "Kwong."

== Notable individuals ==
Kuang Zhun (鄺諄), Kuang Yiping's fourth son, won the imperial examinations in AD 1142. In 1146, he received his commission and in 1152, is appointed the administrative governor of Anching in Lin'an (臨安京城), a Song dynasty capital. In 1168, he was named the Advisor to the Crown Prince (Chinese: 太子太保; pinyin: tàizǐ tàibǎo; Wade–Giles: taizi t'aipao); the imperial inspector of the emperor's dining (simplified Chinese: 光禄大夫; traditional Chinese: 光祿大夫; pinyin: guānglù dàfū; Wade–Giles: kuanglu-tafu); and the rank of nobility and peerage and remained the governor of Lin'an for 60 years. Zhun's wives, He and Feng, were named noble women (一品夫人) at the same time. In AD 1217, the Mongol army invaded the Song and Kuang Zhun ventured north to Yunjing to lead the defense against the Mongols. In AD 1218, Zhun resigned from the court and moves his entire clan back to Heyuan County, Huizhou, Guangdong. He died in AD 1219 of exhaustion. His eldest son, Kuang Yi yuan (鄺一元), remained in Huizhou to guard Zhun's grave until his death.

Kuang Yasheng (鄺一聲), was the third-generation ancestor of the Guangdong clan of the Kuang surname and the third son of Kuang Zhun. Born 2 October 1155, he won the imperial examinations at age 26 and during his thirty years of government service was named the Chief Imperial Doctor (Chinese: 朝奉大夫; pinyin: cháofèng dàifu)，director of the Ministry of Punishments (Chinese: 刑部主政; pinyin: Xíngbù zhǔchèng)，Chancellor of the Imperial college (simplified Chinese: 国子监忌酒; traditional Chinese: 國子監祭酒; pinyin: Guózǐjiàn jìjiǔ), administrative director (simplified Chinese: 尚宝司暑; traditional Chinese: 尚寶司署; pinyin: Shàngbàosī shǔ), Governor of Palace Security (simplified Chinese: 钦差提督; traditional Chinese: 欽差提督; pinyin: Qīnchāi tídū), Minister of Punishments (simplified Chinese: 刑部尚书; traditional Chinese: 刑部尚書; pinyin: Xíngbù shàngshū), and the Advisor to the Crown Prince (Chinese: 太子太保; pinyin: tàizǐ tàibǎo; Wade–Giles: taizi t'aipao). He died 8 July 1246, leaving behind two sons, Kui (奎，style name Gong Shao 字公昭) who became the ancestor of the Kuang clan in Pan Village, Kaiping County, and Xing (興, style name Gong Biao 字公表).

Kuang Lu (鄺露, style name Zhan Ruo "湛若" and psedo-name "Haixue" 海雪) (AD 1604–1650), of Hainan County, Guangdong, was a Ming dynasty literato, specializing in poetry, literature, and calligraphy. In 1634, seventh year of the Chongzhen Emperor's reign (崇禎七年), he offended the magistrate of Hainan County and was exiled to Guangxi province where he became the scribe for five clans, the Cen, Lan, Hu, Hou, and P'an (岑、藍、胡、侯、槃). He later became employed by Yunshan (雲鄲娘), a female warrior of the Yao tribe (瑤族), an ethnic Chinese tribe, and became familiar with the cultural anthropology, geography, and agriculture of the Yao peoples. He later authored Chiya (赤雅), now considered an authoritative book of the ethnic minority cultures and geography of the Guangxi region. He was later employed by King Tang in the Southern Ming period (南明唐王) where he was sent as an emissary to Guangzhou by the Yongli Emperor. When the Manchurian armies conquered the Ming empire, Kuang Lu committed suicide while embracing a traditional Chinese zither, weapon, and a classical text. Kuang Lu, the word Cham if the Hoi snow; the Guangdong Nanhai person (now Hainan Otsu). Famous late Ming Minister.

Kuang Ye (鄺埜, style name "Mengzhi" 孟質), of Yizheng County, Hunan, was a Ming dynasty literato, winning the imperial examination in the reign of the Yongle Emperor and was appointed a position in the Imperial Defense department (兵部右侍郎). Ye's father, Kuang Zifu (鄺子輔), was an Anfu county magistrate (安福縣令) and later the chief educational minister of Chüjung County (句容縣教諭). According to the biography of Kuang Ye in the History of Ming, Zifu was known as a remarkable educator and parent, shaping Mengzhi to become a studious, righteous, incorrupt, serious person exhibiting the utmost filial piety towards his parents. When he was appointed the magistrate of Shan-Tso County, Ye became overcome with solitude from his parents, and decided to employ his father as the county examinations official. When Zifu was notified of this, he became angry, telling his son that as a magistrate, he should not appoint an elder as an employee, due to improper observation of filial piety, remarking that "A son cannot control or complain about a father's work." On another occasion, Mengzhi sent some robes made of a rough cloth to Zifu, and Zifu repudiated Ye, telling him that, "Why then do you insult me by sending me such clothes?" When Ye learned of his father's reaction he broke into tears, accepting his father's scolding. The Kwong Wild Yizhang people (1385 to 1449 years), the Yongle nine (1411 years) Scholars, the word Meng quality, the Yizhang people, Bingbushangshu.

Kuang Yue Guang (鄺曰廣), a Ming literato and a native of Panyu County, Guangdong, was an administrator of the Ming fortress Xiangying. In the Chungshan Emperor's reign, Mongol bandits surrounded the city, Ruigang defended the city and was murdered under a bandit's sword, alongside his wife, concubine, two sons and two daughters. Kwong said Canton the Chungshan decade (1637 years) Scholars, the South China Sea, Ming dynasty the Xiangying push official.

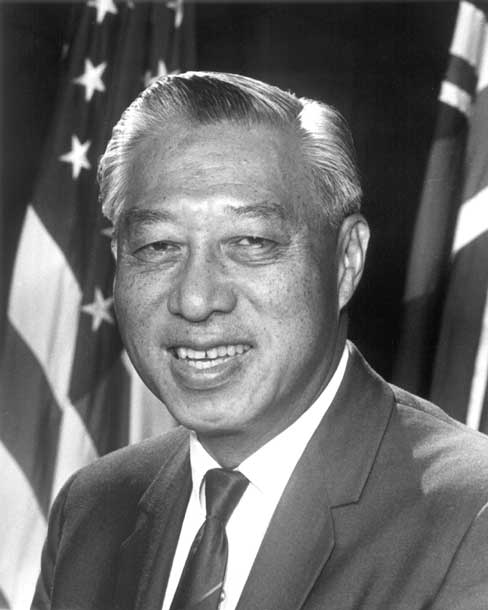
Hiram Fong was the first Chinese American to have served in the United States Senate and also the first Asian American to have launched a primary presidential campaign in a major political party. Note: Due to his family speaking the Taishan dialect of Cantonese, his name was transliterated to Fong.

Hiram Fong* (鄺友良), native of Taishan county, Canton, was a 20th-century American politician. A true Horatio Alger legend, Fong was born into an impoverished family in Kalihi, Hawai'i, on 1 October 1907, as Yau Leong Fong. As a youth, Fong attended public schools, and held a variety of jobs to support his family, by selling beans and newspapers, shining shoes, and caddying golf for a quarter for nine holes. He later attended the University of Hawai'i, where he was the editor for the Ka Leo and Ka Palapala, the yearbook, and was a ROTC cadet, which paid 30 cents a day, "that paid for my lunch", recounted Fong. In 1930, Fong graduated with honors from UH in three years and attended Harvard Law School in 1932, later working as a deputy city attorney in Honolulu from 1935 to 1938. In 1938, Fong won election to the Territorial House of Representatives at the age of 31 and was chosen the House Speaker. His service in the Territorial House halted with the start of World War II in 1942 however, when he was called into action, serving as the judge advocate with the 7th Fighter Command of the Seventh Air Force, earning the rank of major and later retiring as a colonel in the U.S. Air Force Reserve. After his World War II service, Fong returned to his Territorial Legislature seat, finishing his term as the vice president of the Territorial Constitutional Convention in 1950. In 1959, after a successful build-up of one of Hawai'i largest insurance financial empires, he ran for one of the two new US Senate seats for the state, becoming the only Republican to ever represent Hawai'i in the Senate, and the only Asian American to serve in the United States. Fong held the seat until 2 January 1977, when he retired from politics as the ranking Republican on six committees from agriculture to retirement. He returned to his finance empire in 1976, serving as chairman of Finance Enterprises, Ltd. He died due to kidney failure on 18 August 2004 and is interred in Nuuanu Memorial Park and Mortuary.

Joseph Neng Shun Kwong was a chemical engineer who, along with Otto Redlich, developed the Redlich–Kwong equation of state.

Peter Kwong, or The Most Reverend Dr Peter Kong-Kit Kwong (鄺廣傑), is the archbishop of the Anglican province of Hong Kong and served as the first Chinese primate of the Anglican communion until 2006, when he was succeeded by The Most Reverend Dr Paul Kwong.

Li-jen Kwong (鄺麗貞), is the first female mayor of Tai-tung, Taiwan, Republic of China. Wife of former Tai-tung Mayor Wu Jun-li, Li-jen Kwong represents the Kuomintang, the Chinese Nationalist Party.

Paul Kwong, or The Most Reverend Dr Paul Kwong (鄺保祿) is the Primate of Hong Kong Sheng Kung Hui Hong Kong Island Diocese．

Matt Fong† (鄺傑靈) is the adopted son of former Democratic Secretary of State March Fong Eu of California. He is a 1975 graduate of the United States Air Force Academy in 1975 and the Southwestern University School of Law in Los Angeles in 1985, serving as a lieutenant colonel in the Air Force. Fong was the vice chairman of the state Board of Equalization from 1990 to 1994 and as state treasurer until 1998. In the U.S. Senate election, 1998, he challenged sitting California Senator Barbara Boxer unsuccessfully. Since then, he has returned to the practice of law and was appointed by President George W. Bush as the chairman of the Pension Benefit Guaranty Corporation Advisory Board.

† Note: Due to the Taishan dialect which pronounces Kwong as "Fong", the name was transliterated to Fong in the English language.

Cally Kwong (鄺美雲) won Miss Hong Kong 1982 and subsequently entered the Chinese entertainment industry as an actress and successful musician, producing many hits in the eighties. She is also notable for her interest in traditional Chinese opera and instruments.

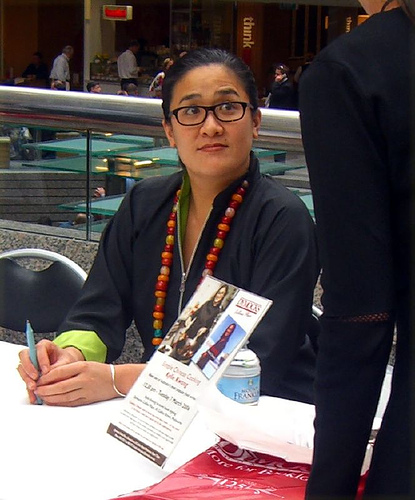
Kylie Kwong

Kylie Kwong (born 1968 in Australia) is a prominent Australian television chef, author, television presenter and restaurateur.

Chi-Kin Kwong, or 鄺志堅, (born 1958) is a member of the Legislative Council of Hong Kong, representing the non-geographical labour functional constituency, and a member of the Bar of England and Hong Kong.

Fong See (鄺泗) is the paternal great-grandfather of Lisa See, an American novelist. The Chinese ancestor has 鄺 as the family name, but for some reason, the given name is passed down as a family name to Lisa See. The Chinese ancestor might have originated from Taishan.

Ling Ling Kwong is the actress of Thai-Hong Kong.

== Organizational affiliations ==
See: Soo Yuen Benevolent Association
