= Fang Man =

Fang Man may refer to:

- Fang Man (Masters of the Universe), a character in Masters of the Universe
- Fang Man (composer) (born 1977), Chinese-born composer in the United States
