= Soo Yuen Benevolent Association =

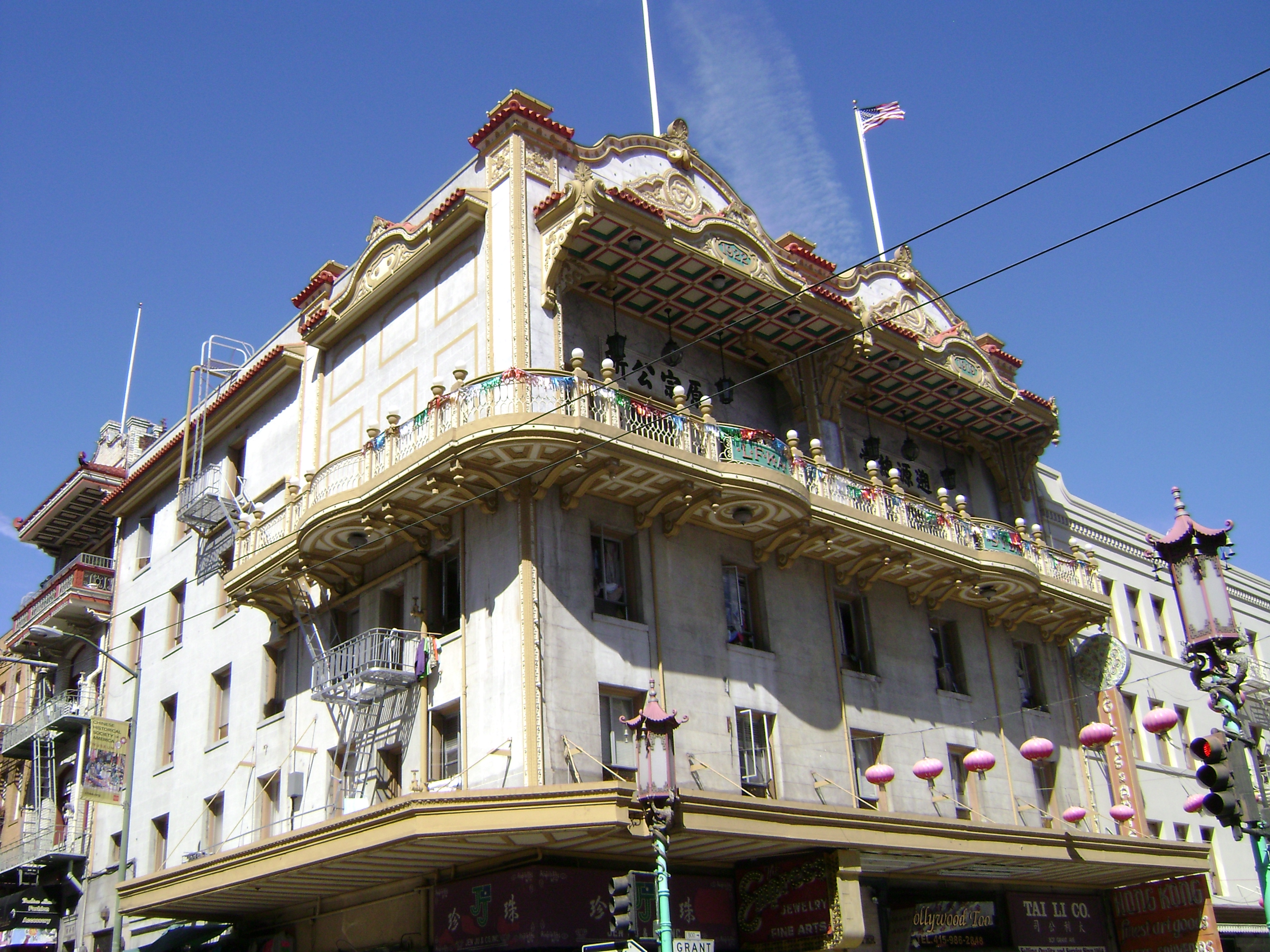
The Soo Yuen Benevolent Association building in San Francisco's Chinatown stands at the corner of Grant and Clay

The Soo Yuen Benevolent Association (Chinese: 遡源堂) was founded in 1846, in the 26th year of the Qing dynasty reign of Daoguang in Shuikou town in Kaiping County. Reflecting the common origin of the Louie, Fong, and Kwong/Fong(hoisanese) families, the Soo Yuen Benevolent Association is made up of members from the three families. The association chairmanship rotates between the three families. In 1880, the main association headquarters were founded in San Francisco and the association building was built in 1886. Today, Soo Yuen Benevolent Association halls are located in over a dozen cities in the United States and Canada, Cuba, Mexico, Singapore, Philippines, Malaysia, Fiji, Thailand, Australia, New Zealand, Myanmar(Burma), Hoisan (Toishan, Taishan) China, and Hong Kong. Wherever there are Chinese communities with the Louie/Lui/Lei (雷), Fong/Fang (方), and Fong/Kwong/Kuang (鄺) surnames, Soo Yuen Benevolent Association halls have been established. The organization publishes a monthly journal and commits the majority of its resources to college scholarships, elderly support payments and financial aid programs to members of the three families.
