= Fang (surname) =

- Romanisation: Fang, Fong, Hong, Png, Pwee, Pung
- Language: Chinese

Chinese name
- Chinese: 方
Transcriptions
Standard Mandarin
- Hanyu Pinyin: fāng
Yue: Cantonese
- Yale Romanization: fong1
Southern Min
- Hokkien POJ: hng

Fang (Chinese: 方) is the 67th most prevalent Chinese surname. In Chinese, Fāng (方) means "square" or "four-sided". Fāng (方) is pronounced Fong in Cantonese, Hong or Png or Pwee in some Min Nan dialects and Png or Pung in Teochew. It is the 56th name on the Hundred Family Surnames poem.

Some more uncommon surnames with romanizations that are also conventionally simplified to "Fang" in English are Fáng (房), meaning "room", and Fāng (芳), meaning "fragrant".

== Etymology ==
During Emperor Huang Di's reign, a descendant called Yu Lei was awarded the land of Fang (north west of Nanyu) for his contributions in defeating a foreign tribe. He was thus known as Fang Lei, and his descendants were given the family name Fang.

Ji Yuan is considered as another forefather of the Fangs. Ji was a general of Zhou Xuan Wang, and was known for his contributions in conquering the north and the south. Since his nickname was Fang Shu, the king awarded him the family name of Fang.

== People with the surname ==
=== Unspecified ===
- Frank F. Fang, (born 1930), Chinese-American physicist

=== 方 (Fāng) ===
Stroke order of the character 方

- Fang (alchemist) (fl. 1st century B.C.), Chinese woman alchemist
- Fang Bao, mid-Ming dynasty era poet
- Fang Bin, Chinese journalist and whistleblower
- Fang Binxing, Chinese computer scientist and politician
- Fang Chengguo, Chinese businessperson
- Fang Chieh-min, Taiwanese badminton player
- Fang Chih, Chinese diplomat
- Fang Congyi, Chinese painter
- Fang Dan, Chinese figure skater
- Fang Fang, Chinese writer
- Fang Guancheng, Qing dynasty noble and government official
- Fang Hui, Song Dynasty scholar
- Fang Jing, Chinese television journalist and anchor
- Fang Jing De (方竟德), Chinese American editor
- Fang La (方腊), Song Dynasty revolutionary leader
- Fang Lijun (方力均), Chinese artist
- Fang Lizhi (方励之) (1936–2012), Chinese astrophysicist and political activist
- Fang Man (composer), American composer of Chinese descent
- Fang Quan (d. 1897), Qing Empire Mandarin
- Fang Rending (1901–1975), Chinese artist
- Fang Shengdong, Chinese revolutionary
- Fang Shu (born 1957), Chinese film actress
- Fang Shuo (方硕) (born 1990), Chinese basketball player
- Fang Weiyi (1585–1668), Chinese poet, calligrapher, painter and literature historian
- Fang Xianjue, Chinese general
- Fāng Xìaorú (方孝孺) (1357–1402), Ming dynasty Confucian scholar
- Fang Xingdong, Chinese Internet entrepreneur and free-speech activist
- Fang Yanqiao, Chinese swimmer
- Fang Yingchao, Chinese volleyball player
- Fang Yuting, Chinese archer
- Fang Zhaoling, Chinese painter and calligrapher
- Fang Zheng, Chinese Political Activist
- Fang Zhenwu, Chinese military officer
- Fang Zhimin (方志敏), Chinese military and political leader
- Achilles Fang, American sinologist and comparatist of Chinese descent
- Florence Fang (born 1933/1934), American businesswoman, publisher and philanthropist
- Harry Fang (方心讓), Hong Kong orthopedic surgeon and politician
- Ian Fang, Chinese actor in Singapore
- Khalil Fong (方大同), Hong Kong singer and songwriter
- Jason H'ng Mooi Lye (方美铼), Malaysian politician
- Ivan Png, Singaporean economist and professor
- Pierre Png (方展发), Singaporean actor and comedian
- Png Eng Huat (方荣发), Singaporean politician and businessman
- Benjamin Pwee (方月光), Singaporean politician and consultant
- Thomé H. Fang, Taiwanese philosopher
- Vincent Fang (entrepreneur), Hong Kong businessperson and politician
- Vincent Fang (lyricist) (方文山), Taiwanese lyricist
- Wai-Chi Fang, Taiwanese engineer
- Wen-Pei Fang, Chinese botanist

=== 房 (Fáng) ===
- Fang Guan, Tang Dynasty official
- Fang Rong, Zhou Dynasty official
- Fang Xuanling (房玄齡) (579–648), Tang Dynasty official
- Jackie Chan (房仕龍), Hong Kong actor; family renamed "Chan" following World War II
- Serena Fang, Taiwanese actress and model

== See also ==
- Fong (disambiguation)
