= Huawei Ox Horn Campus =

Model village in People's Republic of China

Huawei Ox Horn Campus 华为牛角园区
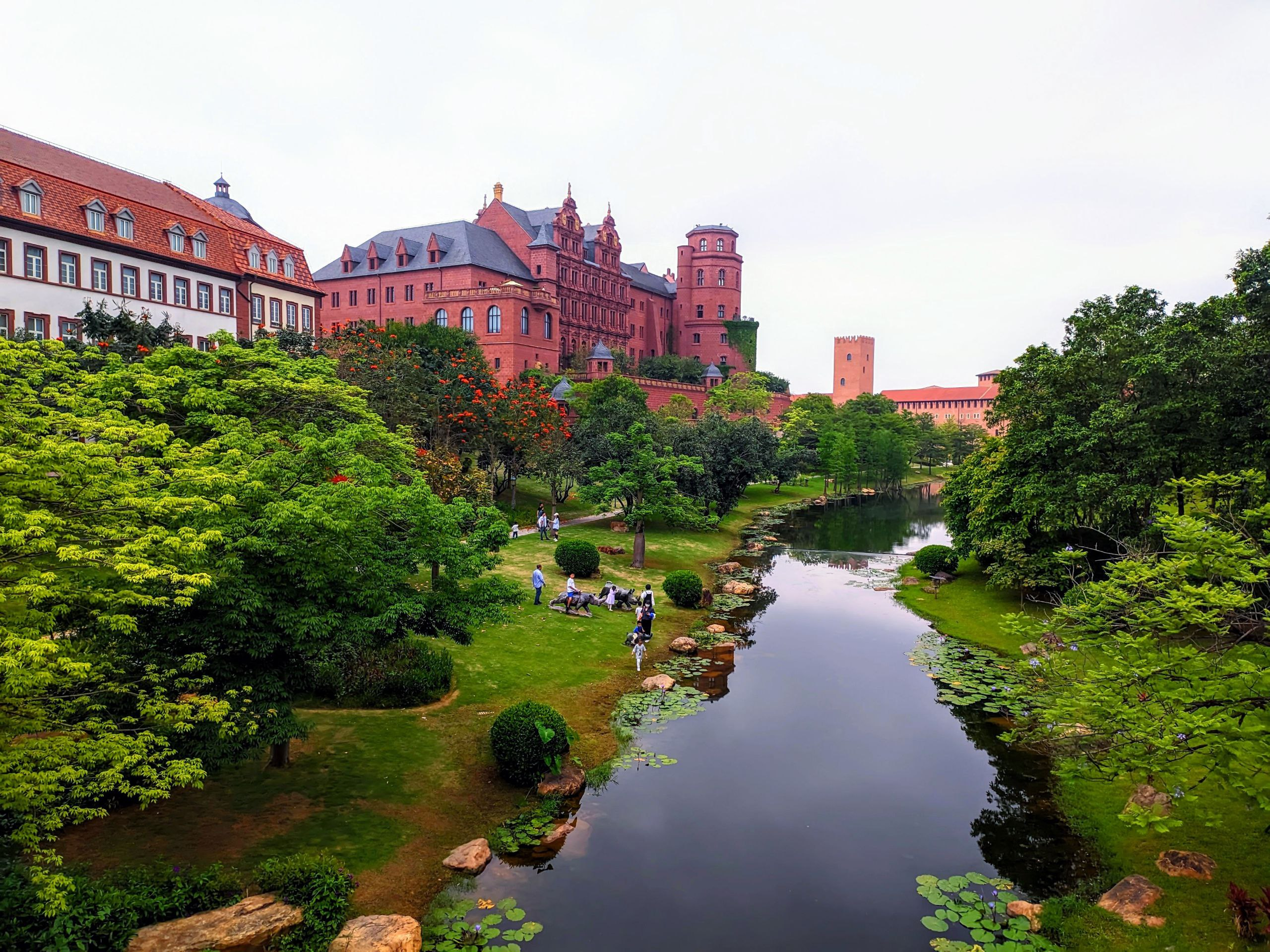
- Interactive map of the Huawei Ox Horn Campus 华为牛角园区 area
- Alternative names: Huawei Xiliu Beipo Village 华为溪流背坡村

General information
- Location: Songshan Lake, Dongguan, Guangdong, China
- Coordinates: 22.888°N 113.888°E
- Opening: April, 2019
- Cost: $1.5 billion
- Owner: Huawei

Dimensions
- Other dimensions: 25,000 people

Huawei Ox Horn Campus is a European-themed model village constructed on the south shore of Songshan Lake, in Dongguan, Guangdong province, China. It was constructed in the late-2010s to house the research and development offices of technology company Huawei.

There are twelve groups of buildings, based on European cities or regions, including Heidelberg Castle, and Cité Internationale Universitaire de Paris, plus one-to-one copies of the buildings of Bruges, Český Krumlov, Verona, Bologna, Budapest, Tallinn, and Granada. The zones are connected together using a tram system modelled on trains supplied by Stadler Rail for the Jungfrau Railway in Switzerland.

== The Battle of Songshan Lake ==
After cooperation with Google became restricted, in October 2019, Huawei assembled over 2,000 engineers from around the world at this campus to jointly develop HMS as an alternative to Google Mobile Services. Due to the campus being located in Songshan Lake, this effort was called the Battle of Songshan Lake (Chinese: 松湖会战; pinyin: Sōnghú Huìzhàn). Fang Xingdong commented that this "large-scale investment did not achieve the expected commercial returns and could even be considered a failure," but it laid the foundation for the rise of HarmonyOS.
