= Joseph Neng Shun Kwong =

Chinese-American chemical engineer (1916–1998)

- Born: October 28, 1916; China
- Died: January 4, 1998 (aged 81); Saint Paul, Minnesota, United States
- Citizenship: China, then United States
- Education: University of Michigan
- Known for: Redlich–Kwong equation of state
- Scientific career
- Fields: chemical engineer, physical chemist
- Workplaces: 3M Company, Shell Development Company
- Thesis: Surface and Energy Relationship in Crushing of Minerals (1942)
- Doctoral advisor: Edgar Lambert Piret

Joseph Neng Shun Kwong (October 28, 1916 – January 4, 1998) was a chemical engineer, most famous for his role in the development of the Redlich–Kwong equation of state.

== Biography ==
Joseph Kwong was born in Chung Won, China in 1916, and emigrated to the United States as a child with his family. Kwong earned a bachelor's degree in 1937 from Stanford University in chemistry and basic medical sciences. He then earned a Master of Science degree in Chemical and Metallurgical Engineering at the University of Michigan, and was awarded a Ph.D. in chemical engineering from the University of Minnesota in 1942.

Kwong worked as a chemical engineer at Minnesota Mining and Manufacturing Co. (later 3M) from 1942 to 1944, helping to develop adhesive products. In 1944, Kwong began working at the Shell Development Company in California. During his time at Shell, Kwong met Otto Redlich, a physical chemist who had fled his native Austria to the United States in 1938 as the Nazis took power. The two presented a paper in 1948 describing what is now known as the Redlich–Kwong equation of state, which related the pressure, volume, and temperature of different compounds. Kwong returned to 3M in 1951 as a senior chemical engineer in the Chemical Division, working there until retirement in 1980, at the age of 64. The development of the Redlich-Kwong equation was the last significant theoretical treatment of thermodynamics. He died of pneumonia in Saint Paul, Minnesota, on January 4, 1998, at the age of 81.
