= Phong =

Phong may refer to:

== Computer graphics ==
- Phong shading
- Phong reflection model
- Blinn–Phong shading model
- Bui Tuong Phong - creator of the Phong shading interpolation method and reflection model.

== Other ==
- Phong-Kniang language
- Nam Phong (disambiguation), various meanings
- Hai Phong
- A character in the animated show ReBoot
- A character in the Infocom text adventure The Witness
- Phong (ghost), a type of Thai ghost

== See also ==
- Fong (disambiguation)
