= Manson Benedict =

American nuclear engineer (1907–2006)

- Born: October 9, 1907; Lake Linden, Michigan
- Died: September 18, 2006 (aged 98); Naples, Florida
- Education: Cornell; MIT
- Awards: William H. Walker Award (1947); E. V. Murphree Award (1963); Perkin Medal (1966); Robert E. Wilson Award (1968); Enrico Fermi Award (1972); National Medal of Science (1975); John Fritz Medal (1975)
- Scientific career
- Fields: Nuclear Engineering
- Workplaces: Manhattan Project; MIT; Atomic Energy Commission

Manson Benedict (October 9, 1907 – September 18, 2006) was an American nuclear engineer and a professor of nuclear engineering at the Massachusetts Institute of Technology (MIT). From 1958 to 1968, he was the chairman of the advisory committee to the U.S. Atomic Energy Commission.

== Biography ==
Born in Lake Linden, Michigan to a Jewish family, Benedict received a B.S. from Cornell University in chemistry, and worked for two years at National Aniline and Chemical Co. before returning to graduate school, earning a Ph.D. from MIT in physical chemistry. It was at MIT where he met his wife Marjorie, who also received a Ph.D. in chemistry. He then became a research chemist at the M. W. Kellogg Limited, where his contributions included the 1940 publication of the Benedict–Webb–Rubin equation.

Benedict was well known for his pioneering role in nuclear engineering. He developed the gaseous diffusion method for separating the isotopes of uranium and supervised the engineering and process development of the K-25 plant in Oak Ridge, Tennessee, where fissionable material for the atomic bomb was produced. He received many awards for his work on the Manhattan Project during World War II, and for his later career as a scientist, educator, and public servant, which focused on nuclear power and other peaceful uses of atomic energy. Among his awards were: the William H. Walker award in 1947, the Perkin Medal in 1966, the Robert E. Wilson Award in 1968, the Enrico Fermi Award in 1972, the Golden Plate Award of the American Academy of Achievement in 1973, and the National Medal of Science from President Gerald Ford in 1975. He was elected a Fellow of the American Academy of Arts and Sciences in 1952, a member of the National Academy of Sciences in 1956, and a member of the American Philosophical Society in 1977.

From 1958 to 1968, Benedict was a member and chair of the advisory committee of the U.S. Atomic Energy Commission, appointed by Presidents Eisenhower and Kennedy.

He established the nuclear engineering department at MIT in 1958 (prior to 1958 it was a program in chemical engineering started by Benedict in 1951), and was head of the department until 1971. He had a role in educating over 500 graduate students.

He died at his home in Naples, Florida, aged 98. His wife Marjorie died in 1995 after 59 years of marriage. Two daughters, Marjorie Cohn of Arlington, Massachusetts, and Mary Sauer of Naperville, Illinois and Naples, Florida, three grandchildren, and four great-grandchildren survive him.
