= Ding Yu Peng =

Chinese chemical engineer

Ding-Yu Peng
- Born: 1943 (age 82–83); Republic of China
- Known for: Peng–Robinson Equation of State
- Scientific career
- Fields: Chemical engineering, Thermodynamics, Research
- Workplaces: University of Saskatchewan, National Taiwan University, University of Missouri, University of Alberta
- Doctoral advisor: Leonard I. Stiel

Ding-Yu Peng is a professor of Chemical Engineering at the University of Saskatchewan. Under the direction of Donald B. Robinson, Peng introduced a two-parameter cubic equation of state now known as the Peng–Robinson equation of state during the 1970s while a research engineer at the University of Alberta.

== Early life ==
Ding-Yu Peng was born in China sometime in 1943.

== Education ==
Peng completed a degree in chemical engineering at the National Taiwan University in 1966. He studied for one year at Syracuse University during 1968-1969. Subsequently, he followed Leonard I. Stiel to the University of Missouri and obtained his PhD. in chemical engineering in 1973.

== Work under Robinson ==
In late 1974, while working as a post-doctoral fellow under Robinson, the Natural Gas Processors Association requested a better gas model than was available at that time. Work on the Peng–Robinson equation of state was completed in 1975, and the results were published the following year.

== Teaching ==
Peng taught thermodynamics and mass transfer at the University of Saskatchewan. He has been a Professor Emeritus since July 2021.

== Awards ==
Peng earned a Doctor of Science degree in 2005. He was also the recipient of the 2006 Donald L. Katz Award by the Gas Processors Association. The award is for "outstanding accomplishments in gas processing research, and for excellence in engineering education."
