= Departure function =

Model of thermodynamic properties

In thermodynamics, a departure function is defined for any thermodynamic property as the difference between the property as computed for an ideal gas and the property of the species as it exists in the real world, for a specified temperature T and pressure P. Common departure functions include those for enthalpy, entropy, and internal energy.

Departure functions are used to calculate real fluid extensive properties (i.e. properties which are computed as a difference between two states). A departure function gives the difference between the real state, at a finite volume or non-zero pressure and temperature, and the ideal state, usually at zero pressure or infinite volume and temperature.

For example, to evaluate enthalpy change between two points h(v_{1},T_{1}) and h(v_{2},T_{2}) we first compute the enthalpy departure function between volume v_{1} and infinite volume at T = T_{1}, then add to that the ideal gas enthalpy change due to the temperature change from T_{1} to T_{2}, then subtract the departure function value between v_{2} and infinite volume.

Departure functions are computed by integrating a function which depends on an equation of state and its derivative.

== General expressions ==
General expressions for the enthalpy H, entropy S and Gibbs free energy G are given by
$$\begin{align}
\frac{H^\mathrm{ig}-H}{RT} &= \int_V^\infty \left[ T \left(\frac{\partial Z}{\partial T}\right)_V \right] \frac{dV}{V} + 1 - Z \\[2ex]
\frac{S^\mathrm{ig}-S}{R} &= \int_V^\infty \left[ T \left(\frac{\partial Z}{\partial T}\right)_V - 1 + Z\right] \frac{dV}{V} - \ln Z \\[2ex]
\frac{G^\mathrm{ig}-G}{RT} &= \int_V^\infty (1-Z) \frac{dV}{V} + \ln Z +1 - Z
\end{align}$$

== Departure functions for Peng–Robinson equation of state ==
The Peng–Robinson equation of state relates the three interdependent state properties pressure P, temperature T, and molar volume V_{m}. From the state properties (P, V_{m}, T), one may compute the departure function for enthalpy per mole (denoted h) and entropy per mole (s):

$$\begin{align}
h_{T,P}-h_{T,P}^{\mathrm{ideal}} &= RT_C\left[T_r(Z-1)-2.078(1+\kappa)\sqrt{\alpha}\ln\left(\frac{Z+2.414B}{Z-0.414B}\right)\right] \\[1.5ex]
s_{T,P}-s_{T,P}^{\mathrm{ideal}} &= R\left[\ln(Z-B)-2.078\kappa\left(\frac{1+\kappa}{\sqrt{T_r}}-\kappa\right)\ln\left(\frac{Z+2.414B}{Z-0.414B}\right)\right]
\end{align}$$

where $\alpha$ is defined in the Peng-Robinson equation of state, T_{r} is the reduced temperature, P_{r} is the reduced pressure, Z is the compressibility factor, and

$$\kappa = 0.37464 + 1.54226\;\omega - 0.26992\;\omega^2$$
$$B = 0.07780\frac{P_r}{T_r}$$

Typically, one knows two of the three state properties (P, V_{m}, T), and must compute the third directly from the equation of state under consideration. To calculate the third state property, it is necessary to know three constants for the species at hand: the critical temperature T_{c}, critical pressure P_{c}, and the acentric factor ω. But once these constants are known, it is possible to evaluate all of the above expressions and hence determine the enthalpy and entropy departures.

== Correlated terms ==
- Residual property (physics)
