= Reduced properties =

State variables for near-critical fluids

In thermodynamics, the reduced properties of a fluid are a set of state variables scaled by the fluid's state properties at its critical point. These dimensionless thermodynamic coordinates, taken together with a substance's compressibility factor, provide the basis for the simplest form of the theorem of corresponding states.

Reduced properties are also used to define the Peng–Robinson equation of state, a model designed to provide reasonable accuracy near the critical point. They are also used to critical exponents, which describe the behaviour of physical quantities near continuous phase transitions.

== Reduced pressure ==
The reduced pressure is defined as its actual pressure $p$ divided by its critical pressure $p_{\rm c}$:

$$p_{\rm r} = {p \over p_{\rm c}}$$

== Reduced temperature ==
The reduced temperature of a fluid is its actual temperature, divided by its critical temperature:

$$T_{\rm r} = {T \over T_{\rm c}}$$

where the actual temperature and critical temperature are expressed in absolute temperature scales (either Kelvin or Rankine). Both the reduced temperature and the reduced pressure are often used in thermodynamical formulas like the Peng–Robinson equation of state.

== Reduced specific volume ==
The reduced specific volume (or "pseudo-reduced specific volume") of a fluid is computed from the ideal gas law at the substance's critical pressure and temperature:

$$v_{\rm r} = \frac{vp_{\rm c}}{RT_{\rm c}}\,$$

This property is useful when the specific volume and either temperature or pressure are known, in which case the missing third property can be computed directly.

== See also ==
- Departure function
