= Benedict–Webb–Rubin equation =

Fluid dynamics equation of state

The Benedict–Webb–Rubin equation (BWR), named after Manson Benedict, G. B. Webb, and L. C. Rubin, is an equation of state used in fluid dynamics. Working at the research laboratory of the M. W. Kellogg Company, the three researchers rearranged the Beattie–Bridgeman equation of state and increased the number of experimentally determined constants to eight.

== The original BWR equation ==
$$P=\rho RT + \left(B_0 RT-A_0 - \frac{C_0}{T^2} \right) \rho^2 + \left(bRT-a\right) \rho^3 + \alpha  a  \rho^6 + \frac{c\rho^3}{T^2}\left(1 + \gamma\rho^2\right)\exp\left(-\gamma\rho^2\right)$$,

where $\rho$ is the molar density.

== The BWRS equation of state ==
A modification of the Benedict–Webb–Rubin equation of state by Professor Kenneth E. Starling of the University of Oklahoma:

$$P=\rho RT + \left(B_0 RT-A_0 - \frac{C_0}{T^2} + \frac{D_0}{T^3} - \frac{E_0}{T^4}\right) \rho^2 + \left(bRT-a-\frac{d}{T}\right) \rho^3 + \alpha\left(a+\frac{d}{T}\right) \rho^6 + \frac{c\rho^3}{T^2}\left(1 + \gamma\rho^2\right)\exp\left(-\gamma\rho^2\right)$$,

where $\rho$ is the molar density. The 11 mixture parameters ($B_0$, $A_0$, etc.) are calculated using the following relations

$$\begin{align}
&A_0 = \sum_i \sum_j x_i x_j A_{0i}^{1/2} A_{0j}^{1/2} (1-k_{ij}) \\
&B_0 = \sum_i x_i B_{0i} \\
&C_0 = \sum_i \sum_j x_i x_j C_{0i}^{1/2} C_{0j}^{1/2} (1-k_{ij})^3 \\
&D_0 = \sum_i \sum_j x_i x_j D_{0i}^{1/2} D_{0j}^{1/2} (1-k_{ij})^4 \\
&E_0 = \sum_i \sum_j x_i x_j E_{0i}^{1/2} E_{0j}^{1/2} (1-k_{ij})^5 \\
&\alpha = \left[ \sum_i x_i \alpha_i^{1/3} \right]^3 \\
&\gamma = \left[ \sum_i x_i \gamma_i^{1/2} \right]^2 \\
&a = \left[ \sum_i x_i a_i^{1/3} \right]^3 \\
&b = \left[ \sum_i x_i b_i^{1/3} \right]^3 \\
&c = \left[ \sum_i x_i c_i^{1/3} \right]^3 \\
&d = \left[ \sum_i x_i d_i^{1/3} \right]^3
\end{align}$$

where $i$ and $j$ are indices for the components, and the summations go over all components. $B_{0i}$, $A_{0i}$, etc. are the parameters for the pure components for the $i$th component, $x_i$ is the mole fraction of the $i$th component, and $k_{ij}$ is an interaction parameter.

Values of the various parameters for 15 substances can be found in Starling's Fluid Properties for Light Petroleum Systems..

== The modified BWR equation (mBWR) ==
A further modification of the Benedict–Webb–Rubin equation of state by Jacobsen and Stewart:

$$P=\sum_{n=1}^{9}a_n\rho^n+\exp\left(-\gamma\rho^2\right)\sum_{n=10}^{15}a_n\rho^{2n-17}$$

where:

$$\gamma=1/\rho_c^2$$

The mBWR equation subsequently evolved into a 32 term version (Younglove and Ely, 1987) with numerical parameters determined by fitting the equation to empirical data for a reference fluid. Other fluids then are described by using reduced variables for temperature and density.

== See also ==
- Real gas
