= Gary Fong =

American film director

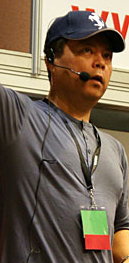
- Fong speaks at SWPP Convention 2009, London
- Born: December 6, 1960 (age 65); Seattle, Washington, U.S.
- Occupations: Entrepreneur, photographer, film director, producer, screenwriter

Gary Fong (born December 6, 1960) is an American entrepreneur, author, former wedding photographer, film director, producer and screenwriter.

== Wedding photography career ==
Originally a musician, while pursuing a degree in Pharmacology to appease his parents' demands to become a doctor, Fong accidentally stumbled upon a Life Magazine article featuring wedding photographer Rocky Gunn in a multi-page spread. Gunn had been a longtime friend of his mother. Feeling that this was more fate than coincidence, Fong pursued Gunn for a chance to assist and learn. It was during this time that Gunn died at age 42 of a sudden heart-attack.

Fong, left with no mentor or proper training, started a wedding photography business in a bedroom of his parents' apartment, and offered his services for $150/no time limit. While this entry price severely undermined the pricing standards, he was able to present comprehensive designs that were far more costly than the standard photography package. He would go on to photograph such people as, Sylvester Stallone, Ronald Reagan, Sidney Sheldon, Lee Remick, Paul McCartney, Peter Criss, Bruce Lee, Todd Rundgren, Priscilla Presley, Pia Zadora, Michael Landon, Florence Henderson, Shelley Fabares, among others.

While watching an on-location filming of Charlie's Angels, Fong saw for the first time an on-set Storyboard and reasoned that wedding photography albums should use a similar format to depict a wedding story. So, using sequential photo layouts rather than static, posed images, Fong introduced the "Storybook Concept". This style of wedding albums remains popular to this day.

Here Comes the Guide, a respected "bible" of wedding planning has said, "Every once in a while someone comes along to revolutionize an art form; for wedding photography, that someone Is Gary Fong."

Fong was selected in the telecast, Weddings 2000 as one of the top ten wedding photographers in the world. This live simulcast was broadcast to movie theaters internationally, and was a first of its kind.

== Lightsphere ==
Discouraged by the look of flash photography because of the flashlight-shaped light source, Fong found the answer in the soft lighting of a lampshade in a hotel room. This led to the invention and patenting of the Lightsphere, a dome-shaped light diffuser, which was introduced in late 2004 and by 2011 had sold more than 400,000 units worldwide.

In 2019, during President Donald Trump's visit with the Royal Family in the U.K., Prince Charles picked a Gary Fong Lightsphere and commented that it “looked like an ice cream.”

== Pictage, Inc. ==
With the advent of digital, Fong knew that online presentation of images would be best matched to an instant print delivery service. So, joining up with Pictage's online presence, Fong brought his own personal print lab into Pictage's headquarters, and installed it in the kitchen. Joining the board of directors and Senior Management team, Pictage started with seven employees in a small office, and within years the employee count would top 150, making Pictage the largest dedicated online digital/web solution anywhere in the United States. Apax Partners invested $29 million to acquire Pictage in 2006.

== Vertical Integration ==
In 2009, Fong began focusing on a style of management called vertical integration. Because the scale of his photographic accessories company had reached a sufficient scale, Fong's Canadian Holding Company began acquiring companies in the Midwestern United States to produce and distribute his products, including a fulfillment facility in Wisconsin Rapids, Wisconsin, and a rapid prototyping and plastics injection molding company adopting use of polylactic acid.

== Memoirs ==
In 2009, Fong published his memoirs, The Accidental Millionaire - How To Succeed In Life Without Really Trying with BenBella Books. "Accidental Millionaire" has been described as "a humorous, poignant memoir of the man said to have revolutionized wedding photography".

In the book, Fong claims that his entire life changed when, during an emotional meltdown, he nearly rear-ended a car that had a bumper sticker that said, "Since I Gave Up Hope, I feel Much Better". From that point, Fong gave up trying to meet or achieve goals, and dropped out of society. It was during this period when he went to Club Med in the Bahamas to vanish, that his greatest inspiration came in the form of maintaining emptiness in not only his schedule but in his aspirations.

This began an awareness of a mindset which Fong calls, "The Law Of Repulsion". In the book and interviews, he theorizes that much of what sabotages a person from success is trying "too hard" to achieve a narrowly focused goal. He lists among the examples of the "Power Of Repulsion", couples who want badly to have children that have better luck becoming pregnant after adopting, or how a salesman with a quota in mind can become more repulsive to closing a sale than if the goal was not so heavily focused upon.

One review described that Fong's approach caused his wealth "to grow only after he stopped focusing on a set goal for success". Fong's seemingly random path to a diversified portfolio of business interests came as he "cast his fate to the wind to free himself and let life lead his path".

== Hollywood Film Career ==
In May 2015, Fong wrote his first screenplay and was discovered by entertainment attorney Shelley Surpin and literary agent Matt Leipzig. He secretly filmed in Canada and Los Angeles the trailer for Best F(r)iends, starring writer/director Tommy Wiseau playing the role of a mortician who recruits actor Greg Sestero's character to join him in an unexplained criminal enterprise.
