= Nam Phong =

Nam Phong may refer to the following places in Thailand:

- Nam Phong district, Khon Kaen province, and a municipality in that district
  - Royal Thai Air Base Nam Phong
- Nam Phong National Park, close to, but not in, Nam Phong district, and named for Nam Phong river
