= Fong Chi Chung =

Businessperson

Fong Chi Chung (Chinese: 方志忠; pinyin: Fāng Zhì Zhōng; born 1968) is the founder, owner and current chief executive officer of Putien Holdings Singapore, the parent company behind the successful and popular Putien restaurant branches, which serves authentic Heng Hwa cuisine.

== Biography ==
=== Early life ===
Fong was born in 1968 in the Fujian province of the People's Republic of China, to two local primary school educators. In his youth, Fong studied at schools in China, pursuing a diploma in the arts prior to moving to Singapore with his family in the year 2000, originally to set up a factory selling electronic parts with his brothers.

=== Education ===
Fong has a China diploma in Arts. In 2010, he enrolled in the National University of Singapore's Asia Pacific Executive Master's in Business Administration course. He is set to graduate in July, 2012.

=== Career ===
Fong established an electronics parts-selling business in Singapore in 2000 with his brothers, but after a few months, he left the business behind to set up a small coffee shop named "Putien" in Kitchener Road, Jalan Besar, Singapore. The reason for his decision was that he had started to miss the home-style cuisine from his hometown in Putian, Fujian. In an interview with Singapore newspaper my paper, Fong stated, "I could not find a place that could satisfy my cravings and revive my memories of home." Putien now has nine outlets nationwide in Singapore, six in Jakarta and one in Malaysia. Fong now has plans to further expand to Mainland China, Republic of China, Japan and to set up 15 new restaurants in Singapore.

=== Personal life ===
==== Citizenship ====
Fong was once a Chinese citizen, but was granted Singapore citizenship in 2008. In 2009, Fong was featured in a public event for new immigrants with then Minister Mentor Lee Kuan Yew at the launch of Lianhe Zaobao's new feature section, Crossroads.

==== Marital status ====
Fong is married to Lau Ying, who is now the director of Putien. They have two children, Fong Chak Wai, 18, and Fong Chak Ka, 20.
