= Ching-Yao Fong =

Chinese physicist

Ching-Yao Fong (Chinese: 方敬堯) is a physicist and a distinguished professor at the University of California, Davis, and also a published author. He is a Fellow of the American Physical Society, Institute of Physics.
