= Fang Man (composer) =

American composer

Fang Man (Chinese: 方满) is a Chinese-born American composer.

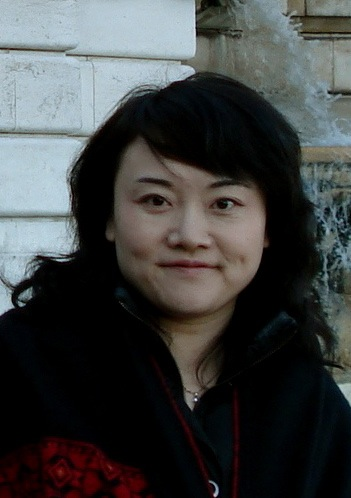
Fang Man 方满

== Compositions ==
=== Orchestral ===
- That Raindrops have Hastened the Falling Flowers III (In memory of Steven Stucky) for Sheng, Cello and Chamber Orchestra (2019)
- Feng (Wind) for Piano, Percussion and Wind Ensemble (2013)
- Deluge 洪水 for Large Ensemble with Live Electronics (2008-9)
- Resurrection 重生 for Clarinet and Chamber Orchestra with Live Electronics (2008-9)
- Sketch 素描 for Orchestra (2008)
- Noir 黑 for Orchestra (2005)
- Aqua 水蓝 In Memoriam Toru Takemitsu for Large Orchestra (2003-4)
- Lavender 薰衣草 for Soprano and Chamber Orchestra (2004)
- Who will bell the cat? 谁去系铃 for Children Band (1998)

=== Chamber ===
- Lament 悲歌 for Solo Bassoon (2017)
- That Raindrops have Hastened the Falling Flowers II (In memory of Steven Stucky) for Flute and Piano (2017)
- That Raindrops have Hastened the Falling Flowers I (In memory of Steven Stucky) for Solo Piano (2016)
- A Folktale of the Four Dragons 四龙传说 II for Solo Flute (2013)
- A Folktale of the Four Dragons 四龙传说 I for Flute and String Quartet (2012)
- Earth: Song Cycle for Soprano, Bass-baritone and Sextet (2012)
- Tao 道 for sheng and violoncello (2009–10)
- Images of 7 Flowers ANNETTE Suite 花之印象 for Organ (2006)
- Maroon 棕栗色 for Sextet (2005–06)
- Larkspur 飞燕草 for Flute, Viola and Harp (2004)
- Thirsty Stone II 渴石 II for Violin Duo (2004)
- Dark Blue 深蓝 for Piano four-hands and Tape (2003)
- Pure White 纯白 for Mallet Quartet (2002)
- Thirsty Stone 渴石 for Violin Duo and Drumset (2002)
- Big Red II 大红 II for Piano Duo (2001)
- Folk Songs 民歌 for Solo Cello (2001)
- String Quartet No.1 第一弦乐四重奏 for String Quartet (1999)
- To one unnamed 鼓孤桐 for 7 Chinese Instruments (1998)
- Ban Qiang Melody 板腔调 (Big Red) for Piano Solo (1996)

=== Electronics ===
- Deluge 洪水 for Large Ensemble with Live Electronics (2008-9)
- Resurrection 重生 for Clarinet and Chamber Orchestra with Live Electronics (2008-9)
- Ambush From Ten Sides 十面埋伏 for Guitar(s) and Live Electronics (2007)

=== Film ===
- Cotton Road 棉花之路 A Documentary Film by Laura Kissel (2014)
