= Fang Xingdong =

Chinese internet entrepreneur and professor

Fang Xingdong (方兴东)
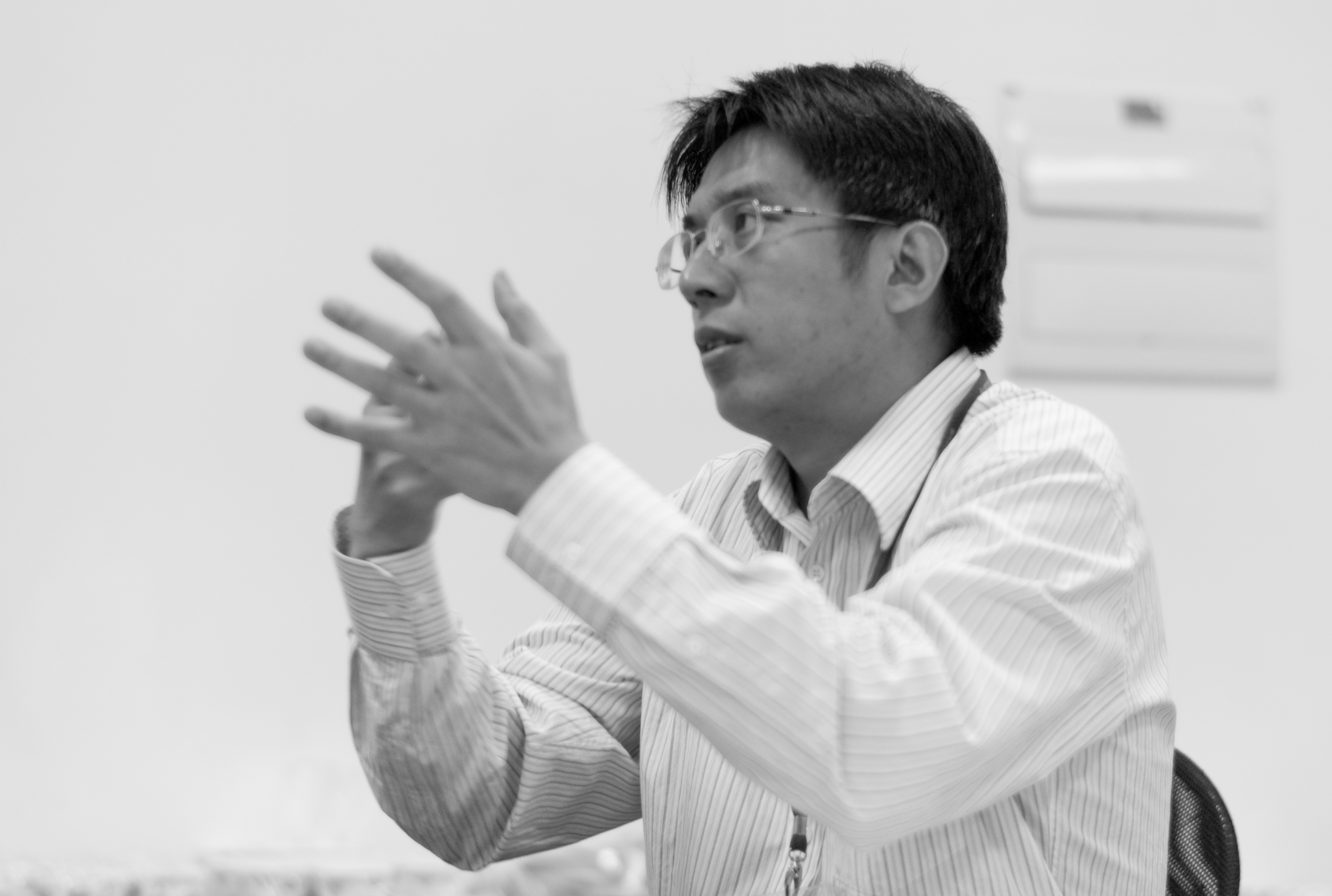
- Fang Xingdong (方兴东); Free speech crusader and Chinese web entrepreneur
- Born: 1969 (age 56–57); Yiwu City, Zhejiang Province, China
- Known for: Founder of Blogchina (now Bokee) and Chinalabs, proponent ("Godfather") of blogging in China, coined "Boke" (Bo Ke) as word for blog
- Website: Chinalabs.com

Fang Xingdong (Chinese: 方兴东) is a Chinese former internet entrepreneur in the early 2000s and currently a professor of Liberal Arts at Zhejiang University, Professor and Doctoral supervisor at the School of Media and International Culture of Zhejiang University, deputy director of the Integrated Media Research Center, Chief Expert of the Institute of Social Governance at Zhejiang University, Deputy Chairman of the Zhejiang University Committee of the China Association for Promoting Democracy, and Vice President and executive director of the Museum and History Communication Committee of the Chinese Association for History of Journalism and Mass Communication.

He has completed more than 50 Internet-related national and provincial projects and undertaking several major projects. He is the initiator of the "Oral History of the Internet" (OHI) project, the founder and director of the CyberLabs, and the founder of BlogChina. He has participated in, witnessed, and tracked the research on China's Internet development.

He launched the blogchina.com (now bokee.com) in 2002 and received some funding from venture capital firms in 2005. But it quickly became a complete failure in just half an year. He is a proponent of cyber sovereignty and sometimes writes for Global Times, a Chinese 'belligerent state tabloid'.

A controversial figure in China, he has been implicated in several alleged scandals, such as plagiarism in his doctoral thesis when he was in Tsinghua University, massive piracy in one of his failed online encyclopedia business in 2005 and so on. His chinalabs.com, although appears to be a web research consultancy, was accused of launching a cyber defamation campaign against Alibaba in 2017 after signing a contract with JD.com (a competitor of Alibaba), whose CEO faced rape allegation in 2018.

He has published 30 Internet-related books, including "IT History" and "Oral History of the Internet Series", among which "Stand-up to Challenge Microsoft Hegemony" published in 1999 was the only book selected as one of the "100 Most Influential Books of the 20th Century for Chinese People". "Research on the Propagation Mechanism and Governance of WeChat" is the most cited paper in the field of Chinese communication in the last 10 years. He is one of the earliest pioneers and promoters of the concepts and theories of Internet anti-monopoly, network governance, blog, Web 2.0, super platform, and digital governance in China.

He received his undergraduate (1991) and master's degrees (1994) from Xi'an Jiaotong University, his doctorate from Tsinghua University (2006), his postdoctoral degree from Zhejiang University, and his postdoctoral degree from the State Information Center, Visiting Scholar at the USC Annenberg School for Communication and Journalism (2019)

== Sources ==
- Fannin, Febecca A. (2007). Silicon Dragon: How China is Winning the Tech Race. McGraw-Hill. p. 101. ISBN 9780071494472.
- MacKinnon, Rebecca (9 August 2007). "Flatter world and thicker walls? Blogs, censorship and civic discourse in China". Public Choice. 134 (1–2): 31–46. doi:10.1007/s11127-007-9199-0. S2CID 154501423.
- Ni, Jin (2007-05-23). "BBC: China abandons blog identity plan". BBC News.
- Pan, Phillip P. (2006-02-21). "Bloggers Who Pursue Change Confront Fear And Mistrust". Washington Post. pp. A01.
- Zhao, Shijun; Peng Nie; Weifeng Xu (2006). 时尚中国—网动中国英 (Networks in China - English translation). McGraw-Hill. pp. 37–39. ISBN 9787508509310.
