= Sandra Fong =

American Olympic sport shooter

Personal information
- Nationality: United States
- Born: April 15, 1990 (age 36) New York, New York, U.S.
- Height: 5 ft 2 in (1.57 m)
- Weight: 126 lb (57 kg)

Sport
- Sport: Shooting
- Events: 10 m air rifle (AR40); 50 m rifle 3 positions (STR3X20)
- Club: Ridgewood Rifle Club
- Coached by: David Johnson (national)

Sandra Fong (born April 15, 1990, in New York, New York) is an American Olympic sport shooter.

She is a multiple-time American junior record holder, and a three-time medalist (one gold and two silver) for the small-bore rifle prone and rifle three positions at the U.S. National Shooting Championships. At the 2008 Summer Olympics in Beijing, Fong competed in the women's 50 m rifle 3 positions, finishing in 21st place. She won a gold medal, as a member of the U.S. rifle shooting team, at the 2010 ISSF World Shooting Championships in Munich, Germany.

== Family life and education ==
Fong was born and raised on the Upper East Side of Manhattan, New York by her parents Nicole Bergman, an attorney, and Yuman Fong, a resident surgeon at the Memorial Sloan–Kettering Cancer Center, emigrating from Hong Kong. She began rifle shooting with her siblings and father as a family sport. Her older sister, Abigail Fong, is a past U.S. national shooting champion, a member of the Princeton University rifle team, and a resident athlete at the U.S. Olympic Training Center in Colorado Springs, Colorado. Her younger sister, Danielle Fong, who has cerebral palsy, is a member of the U.S. Paralympic team (Beijing, 2008).

In 2008, Fong graduated from Hunter College High School in Manhattan, where she also competed for track and field and swimming. She attended Princeton University as a pre-medicine student and theater and anthropology major, and eventually joined her sister Abigail to become a member for the University's rifle shooting club, graduating in 2013. She attended the Icahn School of Medicine at Mount Sinai, after having been admitted to Mount Sinai in her sophomore year at Princeton. She is currently a general surgery resident at Massachusetts General Hospital.

She is Jewish, and is a member of Temple Shaaray Tefila in New York City.

== Shooting career ==
Since beginning the sport, Fong had competed in numerous shooting tournaments, where she achieved junior records and top finishes for the small-bore rifle prone and rifle three positions, including three medals (one gold and two silver) at the U.S. National Shooting Championships (2006–08).

At the age of eighteen, Fong reached her breakthrough in shooting, when she edged out her sister Abigail by three tenths of a point (0.3) in the rifle three positions at the U.S. Olympic Team Trials in Fort Benning, Georgia, with a score of 672.7 points. Finishing second from the trials, she guaranteed a qualifying place for the 2008 Summer Olympics in Beijing, as the youngest member of the U.S. shooting team.

At the 2008 Summer Olympics in Beijing, Fong competed in the women's 50 m rifle 3 positions, along with her teammate Jamie Beyerle. She was able to shoot 196 targets each in prone and kneeling position, and 185 in standing, for a total score of 577 points, finishing in twenty-first place.

Two years after competing in her first Olympics, Fong captured two silver medals for the small-bore rifle prone and rifle three positions at the 2010 Championships of the Americas (CAT Games) in Rio de Janeiro, Brazil. She also helped the U.S. rifle shooting team (along with Jamie Beyerle and Amy Sowash) win the gold medal, and set a world record of 1,758 points at the 2010 ISSF World Shooting Championships in Munich, Germany.
