= Danielle Fong (sport shooter) =

American rifle shooter

Personal information
- National team: United States
- Born: August 3, 1991 (age 33)
- Home town: New York, New York , U.S.

Sport
- Country: United States
- Sport: Shooting
- Disability: Cerebral Palsy
- Disability class: SH1

Danielle Fong (born August 3, 1991) is an American rifle shooter who represented the United States at the 2008 Summer Paralympics. She is a holder of two USA Shooting national records and four NRA national records.

== Early life and education ==
Fong was born with cerebral palsy in 1991 and grew up on the Upper East Side of Manhattan. She attended the Hewitt School from Kindergarten to 12th grade. She was a four-year captain of the school's Future Problem Solvers' team that represented New York State in national competition for six consecutive years. She was also an avid sportswoman, and was a member of the school's track and field, cross-country, volleyball, and swimming teams. She was the Hewitt Middle School's Most Improved Athlete. Fong was a three-time captain and MVP of the high school swimming team, and in her senior year was named to the Athletic Association of Independent Schools (AAIS) coaches all star team.

She attended Barnard College at Columbia University in New York City, where she studied political science.

== Shooting sport career ==
Since beginning the sport, Fong has employed many high-level coaches, including Michele Makucevich, Janet Raab, Marcus Raab, and Chuck Meyer. Her current coach is Olympic silver medalist Bob Foth.

Fong was a member of the U.S. Paralympic Team (Beijing, 2008). She competed in the Women's R2-10 m air rifle standing SH1 and Women's R8-50 m sport rifle 3x20 SH1 events.

Fong was a member of the United States Paralympic World Championships Team in 2006 and 2010. She has been a member of the Paralympic World Cup Team since 2006.

She placed 5th in prone smallbore rifle at the 2010 IPC Shooting World Championships in Zagreb, Croatia. She also won two silver medals at the Alicante World Cup 2009, and 2 golds and a silver medal as a member of the junior team at the Championships of the Americas.

She is a holder of six national records: two USA Shooting national records (three-person team record for junior and women for 50 ft prone), and four NRA national records (Four person team 120 shots three position conventional outdoors 50 yards open and civilian, and 120 shots three position 50 meters open and civilian).

== Family ==
Fong began rifle shooting with her sisters and father as a family sport. Her older sister, Abigail Fong, is a past National Champion in rifle shooting and is currently a resident athlete at the US Olympic Training Center in Colorado Springs. Her sister Sandra Fong represented the United States at the Beijing Olympics, and was a member of the US women's team that won the team world championship and broke the world record at the 2010 World Championships in Munich.
