= Otto Redlich =

Austrian chemist (1896–1978)

- Born: November 4, 1896; Vienna, Austria
- Died: August 14, 1978 (aged 81); California, United States
- Education: University of Vienna
- Known for: Redlich-Kwong equation Teller-Redlich rule
- Scientific career
- Fields: physical chemist
- Workplaces: University of Vienna, Washington State College; Shell Development Co., University of California, Berkeley

Otto Redlich (November 4, 1896 – August 14, 1978) was an Austrian physical chemist who is best known for his development of equations of state like the Redlich-Kwong equation. Redlich also made numerous other contributions to science. He won the Haitinger Prize of the Austrian Academy of Sciences in 1932.

== Biography ==
Redlich was born 1896 in Vienna, Austria. He went to school in the Döbling district of Vienna. After finishing school in 1915 he joined the Austrian Hungarian Army and served as an artillery officer, mainly at the Italian front, in World War I. He was wounded and became a prisoner of war in August 1918. He returned to Vienna after the war in 1919. He studied chemistry and received his doctorate in 1922 for work on the equilibrium of nitric acid, nitrous and nitric oxide. Redlich worked for one year in industry before joining Emil Abel at the University of Vienna. He became a lecturer in 1929 and a professor in 1937. During this time he developed the Teller-Redlich isotopic product rule. After the Anschluss in March 1938, Austria became a part of Nazi Germany, and with the implementation of the Nuremberg Laws all government employed Jews lost their jobs, including academics. Like many other scientists, Redlich tried to leave Nazi-governed Austria.

With the help of the Emergency Committee in Aid of Displaced Foreign Scholars, Redlich was able to emigrate to the United States in December 1938. He gave lectures at several universities and met Gilbert N. Lewis and Linus Pauling. Harold Urey helped him to obtain a position in Washington State College. In 1945 he left the college to work in industry, at Shell Development Co. in Emeryville, California. He published his paper on the improvement of the ideal gas equation in 1949, today known as the Redlich–Kwong equation of state.

In 1962 Redlich retired from Shell and received a position at University of California at Berkeley. He died in California in 1978.

== Bibliography ==
- Redlich, Otto (1976). Thermodynamics: Fundamentals, Applications. Elsevier Scientific Publishing Company. ISBN 978-0-444-41487-8.
- Reif-Acherman, Simón (2008). "Otto Redlich: chemist and gentleman from the 'old school'". Química Nova. 31 (7): 1901–1908. doi:10.1590/S0100-40422008000700053.
