= Acentric factor =

Measure of the non-sphericity of molecules

The acentric factor ω is a conceptual number introduced by Kenneth Pitzer in 1955, proven to be useful in the description of fluids. It has become a standard for the phase characterization of single and pure components, along with other state description parameters such as molecular weight, critical temperature, critical pressure, and critical volume (or critical compressibility). The acentric factor is also said to be a measure of the non-sphericity (centricity) of molecules.

Pitzer defined ω from the relationship

$$\omega = -\log_{10}(p^\text{sat}_\text{r}) - 1 \text{ at } T_\text{r} = 0.7,$$

where $p^\text{sat}_\text{r} = p^\text{sat} / p_c$ is the reduced saturation vapor pressure, and $T_\text{r} = T / T_c$ is the reduced temperature.

Pitzer developed this factor by studying the vapor-pressure curves of various pure substances. Thermodynamically, the vapor-pressure curve for pure components can be mathematically described using the Clausius–Clapeyron equation.

The integrated form of equation is mainly used for obtaining vapor-pressure data mathematically. This integrated version shows that the relationship between the logarithm of vapor pressure and the reciprocal of absolute temperature is approximately linear.

For a series of fluids, as the acentric factor increases the vapor curve is "pulled" down, resulting in higher boiling points. For many monatomic fluids, $p^\text{sat}_\text{r} \approx 0.1$ at $T_\text{r} = 0.7,$ which leads to $\omega \to 0$. In many cases, $T_\text{r} = 0.7$ lies above the boiling temperature of liquids at atmosphere pressure.

Values of ω can be determined for any fluid from accurate experimental vapor-pressure data. The definition of ω gives values close to zero for the noble gases argon, krypton, and xenon. $\omega$ is also very close to zero for molecules which are nearly spherical. Values of ω ≤ −1 correspond to vapor pressures above the critical pressure and are non-physical.

The acentric factor can be predicted analytically from some equations of state. For example, it can be easily shown from the above definition that a van der Waals fluid has an acentric factor of about −0.302024, which if applied to a real system would indicate a small, ultra-spherical molecule.

== Values of some common gases ==
| Molecule | Acentric factor |
|---|---|
| Acetone | 0.304 |
| Acetylene | 0.187 |
| Ammonia | 0.253 |
| Argon | 0.000 |
| Carbon dioxide | 0.228 |
| Decane | 0.484 |
| Ethanol | 0.644 |
| Helium | −0.390 |
| Hydrogen | −0.220 |
| Krypton | 0.000 |
| Methanol | 0.556 |
| Neon | 0.000 |
| Nitrogen | 0.040 |
| Nitrous oxide | 0.142 |
| Oxygen | 0.022 |
| Xenon | 0.000 |

== See also ==
- Equation of state
- Reduced pressure
- Reduced temperature
