= Shell Development Emeryville =

US research facility

Coordinates: 37.8341°N 122.2886°W

The Emeryville Research Center of Shell Development Company in Emeryville, California was a major research facility of Shell Oil Company in the United States from 1928 until 1972, when Shell Development relocated to Houston, Texas. Shell Development's Emeryville facilities were located on about 27 acres (110,000 m^{2}), included nearly 90 buildings at its peak, and when decommissioned in 1972, employed a staff of about 1500.

== Inventions, technical contributions, resources ==
Tricresyl phosphate (TCP) and other gasoline additives were developed at Emeryville, as well as Tar sands extraction and other techniques to increase oil reserves were studied at bench scale and in pilot plants.

Shell Development also developed de-sulfurization methods and standards for gasoline and motor oil, which were successful in reducing acid rain and other adverse environmental effects of auto exhaust gases. Shell Development scientist Thomas Schatzky also helped develop fingerprinting techniques to identify oil spills' origins.

Shell polymer scientists revised the community's understanding of polymerization physics for styrene-butadiene rubber (SBR), a principal component modern tires. SBR provided a new material for tires for the Allies' after the shortage created during World War II for military vehicles. Shell's Charles Wilcoxen later demonstrated the kinetics of the polymerization process, amending the assumptions of the Ziegler-Natta polymerization equations for which a Nobel prize was awarded in 1963. Shell Development also supplied a class of materials called block copolymers, used for medical applications such as artificial heart valves.
