= Dissipation =

Irreversible transformation of energy into forms less capable of doing work

In thermodynamics, dissipation is an irreversible process affecting a non-uniform combination of several bodies of matter and energy, in which its total energy (the sum of internal, whole body motion kinetic, and whole body positional potential energies) transforms so as to reduce its capacity to do thermodynamic work. For example, transfer of energy as heat is dissipative because initially locally concentrated energy disperses. Following the second law of thermodynamics, in conduction and radiation from one body to another, the spread of energy reduces the eventual capacity of the combination of the two bodies to do thermodynamic work, and increases its entropy.

In mechanical engineering, dissipation is the irreversible conversion of mechanical energy into thermal energy with an associated increase in entropy.

Processes with defined local temperature produce entropy at a certain rate. The entropy production rate times local temperature gives the dissipated power. Important examples of irreversible processes are: heat flow through a thermal resistance, fluid flow through a flow resistance, diffusion (mixing), chemical reactions, and electric current flow through an electrical resistance (Joule heating).

== Definition ==
Dissipative thermodynamic processes are essentially irreversible because they produce entropy. Planck regarded friction as the prime example of an irreversible thermodynamic process. In a process in which the temperature is locally continuously defined, the local density of rate of entropy production times local temperature gives the local density of dissipated power.

A particular occurrence of a dissipative process cannot be described by a single individual Hamiltonian formalism. A dissipative process requires a collection of admissible individual Hamiltonian descriptions, exactly which one describes the actual particular occurrence of the process of interest being unknown. This includes friction and hammering, and all similar forces that result in decoherence of energy—that is, conversion of coherent or directed energy flow into an indirected or more isotropic distribution of energy.

=== Energy ===
"The conversion of mechanical energy into heat is called energy dissipation." – François Roddier The term is also applied to the loss of energy due to generation of unwanted heat in electric and electronic circuits.

=== Computational physics ===
In computational physics, numerical dissipation (also known as "Numerical diffusion") refers to certain side-effects that may occur as a result of a numerical solution to a differential equation. When the pure advection equation, which is free of dissipation, is solved by a numerical approximation method, the energy of the initial wave may be reduced in a way analogous to a diffusional process. Such a method is said to contain 'dissipation'. In some cases, "artificial dissipation" is intentionally added to improve the numerical stability characteristics of the solution.

=== Mathematics ===
A formal, mathematical definition of dissipation, as commonly used in the mathematical study of measure-preserving dynamical systems, is given in the article wandering set.

== Examples ==
=== In hydraulic engineering ===
Dissipation is the process of converting mechanical energy of downward-flowing water into thermal and acoustical energy. Various devices are designed in stream beds to reduce the kinetic energy of flowing waters to reduce their erosive potential on banks and river bottoms. Very often, these devices look like small waterfalls or cascades, where water flows vertically or over riprap to lose some of its kinetic energy.

=== Irreversible processes ===
Important examples of irreversible processes are:

1. Heat flow through a thermal resistance
2. Fluid flow through a flow resistance
3. Diffusion (mixing)
4. Chemical reactions
5. Electrical current flow through an electrical resistance (Joule heating).

=== Waves or oscillations ===
Waves or oscillations, lose energy over time, typically from friction or turbulence. In many cases, the "lost" energy raises the temperature of the system. For example, a wave that loses amplitude is said to dissipate. The precise nature of the effects depends on the nature of the wave: an atmospheric wave, for instance, may dissipate close to the surface due to friction with the land mass, and at higher levels due to radiative cooling.

== History ==
The concept of dissipation was introduced in the field of thermodynamics by William Thomson (Lord Kelvin) in 1852. Lord Kelvin deduced that a subset of the above-mentioned irreversible dissipative processes will occur unless a process is governed by a "perfect thermodynamic engine". The processes that Lord Kelvin identified were friction, diffusion, conduction of heat and the absorption of light.

== See also ==
- Entropy production
  - General equation of heat transfer
- Flood control
- Principle of maximum entropy
- Two-dimensional gas
