= Adiabatic conductivity =

Adiabatic conductivity is a measure of a material's electrical conductivity, σ, under thermodynamically adiabatic conditions.

== See also ==
- Thermodynamics
