= General equation of heat transfer =

Entropy production in Newtonian fluids

In fluid dynamics, the general equation of heat transfer is a nonlinear partial differential equation describing specific entropy production in a Newtonian fluid subject to thermal conduction and viscous forces:

$\underbrace{\rho T{Ds\over{Dt}}}_{\text{Heat Gain}} = \underbrace{\nabla\cdot (\kappa\nabla T)}_{\text{Thermal Conduction}} + \underbrace{{\mu\over{2}}\left( {\partial v_{i}\over{\partial x_{j}}} + {\partial v_{j}\over{\partial x_{i}}} - {2\over{3}}\delta_{ij}\nabla\cdot {\bf v} \right)^{2} + \zeta(\nabla\cdot {\bf v})^{2}}_{\text{Viscous Dissipation}}$

where $s$ is the specific entropy, $\rho$ is the fluid's density, $T$ is the fluid's temperature, $D/Dt$ is the material derivative, $\kappa$ is the thermal conductivity, $\mu$ is the dynamic viscosity, $\zeta$ is the second Lamé parameter, ${\bf v}$ is the flow velocity, $\nabla$ is the del operator used to characterize the gradient and divergence, and $\delta_{ij}$ is the Kronecker delta.

If the flow velocity is negligible, the general equation of heat transfer reduces to the standard heat equation. It may also be extended to rotating, stratified flows, such as those encountered in geophysical fluid dynamics.

== Derivation ==
=== Extension of the ideal fluid energy equation ===
For a viscous, Newtonian fluid, the governing equations for mass conservation and momentum conservation are the continuity equation and the Navier-Stokes equations:
$$\begin{aligned}
{\partial \rho\over{\partial t}} &= -\nabla\cdot (\rho {\bf v}) \\
\rho {D{\bf v}\over{Dt}} &= -\nabla p + \nabla \cdot \sigma
\end{aligned}$$
where $p$ is the pressure and $\sigma$ is the viscous stress tensor, with the components of the viscous stress tensor given by:
$$\sigma_{ij} = \mu\left( {\partial v_{i}\over{\partial x_{j}}} + {\partial v_{j}\over{\partial x_{i}}} - {2\over{3}}\delta_{ij}\nabla\cdot {\bf v} \right) + \zeta \delta_{ij}\nabla\cdot {\bf v}$$
The energy of a unit volume of the fluid is the sum of the kinetic energy $\rho v^{2}/2 \equiv \rho k$ and the internal energy $\rho\varepsilon$, where $\varepsilon$ is the specific internal energy. In an ideal fluid, as described by the Euler equations, the conservation of energy is defined by the equation:
$${\partial\over{\partial t}}\left[ \rho (k+\varepsilon) \right] + \nabla\cdot \left[ \rho {\bf v}(k+ h) \right] = 0$$
where $h$ is the specific enthalpy. However, for conservation of energy to hold in a viscous fluid subject to thermal conduction, the energy flux due to advection $\rho {\bf v}(k+h)$ must be supplemented by a heat flux given by Fourier's law ${\bf q} = -\kappa\nabla T$ and a flux due to internal friction $-\sigma\cdot {\bf v}$. Then the general equation for conservation of energy is:
$${\partial\over{\partial t}}\left[ \rho (k+\varepsilon) \right] + \nabla\cdot \left[ \rho {\bf v}(k+ h) - \kappa\nabla T - \sigma\cdot {\bf v} \right] = 0$$

=== Equation for entropy production ===
Note that the thermodynamic relations for the internal energy and enthalpy are given by:
$$\begin{aligned}
\rho d\varepsilon &= \rho Tds + {p\over{\rho}}d\rho \\
\rho dh &= \rho Tds + dp
\end{aligned}$$
We may also obtain an equation for the kinetic energy by taking the dot product of the Navier-Stokes equation with the flow velocity ${\bf v}$ to yield:
$$\rho {Dk\over{Dt}} = -{\bf v}\cdot \nabla p + v_{i}{\partial\sigma_{ij}\over{\partial x_{j}}}$$
The second term on the righthand side may be expanded to read:
$$\begin{aligned}
v_{i} {\partial \sigma_{ij}\over{\partial x_{j}}} &= {\partial\over{\partial x_{j}}}\left(\sigma_{ij}v_{i} \right ) - \sigma_{ij}{\partial v_{i}\over{\partial x_{j}}} \\
&\equiv \nabla\cdot (\sigma \cdot {\bf v}) - \sigma_{ij}{\partial v_{i}\over{\partial x_{j}}}
\end{aligned}$$
With the aid of the thermodynamic relation for enthalpy and the last result, we may then put the kinetic energy equation into the form:
$$\rho {Dk\over{Dt}} = -\rho {\bf v}\cdot \nabla h + \rho T {\bf v}\cdot \nabla s + \nabla\cdot (\sigma \cdot {\bf v}) - \sigma_{ij}{\partial v_{i}\over{\partial x_{j}}}$$
Now expanding the time derivative of the total energy, we have:
$${\partial\over{\partial t}}\left[ \rho (k+\varepsilon) \right] = \rho {\partial k\over{\partial t}} + \rho {\partial\varepsilon\over{\partial t}} + (k+\varepsilon) {\partial \rho\over{\partial t}}$$
Then by expanding each of these terms, we find that:
$$\begin{aligned}
\rho {\partial k\over{\partial t}} &= -\rho {\bf v}\cdot\nabla k - \rho {\bf v}\cdot\nabla h + \rho T{\bf v}\cdot \nabla s + \nabla\cdot(\sigma\cdot {\bf v}) - \sigma_{ij}{\partial v_{i}\over{\partial x_{j}}} \\
\rho {\partial\varepsilon\over{\partial t}} &= \rho T {\partial s\over{\partial t}} - {p\over{\rho}}\nabla\cdot(\rho {\bf v}) \\
(k+\varepsilon){\partial\rho\over{\partial t}} &= -(k+\varepsilon)\nabla\cdot (\rho {\bf v})
\end{aligned}$$
And collecting terms, we are left with:
$${\partial\over{\partial t}}\left[\rho(k+\varepsilon) \right ] + \nabla \cdot\left[\rho {\bf v}(k+h) - \sigma\cdot {\bf v} \right ] = \rho T {Ds\over{Dt}} - \sigma_{ij}{\partial v_{i}\over{\partial x_{j}}}$$
Now adding the divergence of the heat flux due to thermal conduction to each side, we have that:
$${\partial\over{\partial t}}\left[\rho(k+\varepsilon) \right ] + \nabla \cdot\left[\rho {\bf v}(k+h) - \kappa\nabla T - \sigma\cdot {\bf v} \right ] = \rho T {Ds\over{Dt}} - \nabla\cdot(\kappa\nabla T) - \sigma_{ij}{\partial v_{i}\over{\partial x_{j}}}$$
However, we know that by the conservation of energy on the lefthand side is equal to zero, leaving us with:
$$\rho T {Ds\over{Dt}} = \nabla\cdot(\kappa\nabla T) + \sigma_{ij}{\partial v_{i}\over{\partial x_{j}}}$$
The product of the viscous stress tensor and the velocity gradient can be expanded as:
$$\begin{aligned}
\sigma_{ij}{\partial v_{i}\over{\partial x_{j}}} &= \mu\left( {\partial v_{i}\over{\partial x_{j}}} + {\partial v_{j}\over{\partial x_{i}}} - {2\over{3}}\delta_{ij}\nabla\cdot {\bf v} \right){\partial v_{i}\over{\partial x_{j}}} + \zeta \delta_{ij}{\partial v_{i}\over{\partial x_{j}}}\nabla\cdot {\bf v} \\
&= {\mu\over{2}}\left( {\partial v_{i}\over{\partial x_{j}}} + {\partial v_{j}\over{\partial x_{i}}} - {2\over{3}}\delta_{ij}\nabla\cdot {\bf v} \right)^{2} + \zeta(\nabla \cdot {\bf v})^{2}
\end{aligned}$$
Thus leading to the final form of the equation for specific entropy production:
$$\rho T {Ds\over{Dt}} = \nabla\cdot(\kappa\nabla T) + {\mu\over{2}}\left( {\partial v_{i}\over{\partial x_{j}}} + {\partial v_{j}\over{\partial x_{i}}} - {2\over{3}}\delta_{ij}\nabla\cdot {\bf v} \right)^{2} + \zeta(\nabla \cdot {\bf v})^{2}$$
In the case where thermal conduction and viscous forces are absent, the equation for entropy production collapses to $Ds/Dt=0$ - showing that ideal fluid flow is isentropic.

== Application ==
This equation is derived in Section 49, at the opening of the chapter on "Thermal Conduction in Fluids" in the sixth volume of L.D. Landau and E.M. Lifshitz's Course of Theoretical Physics. It might be used to measure the heat transfer and air flow in a domestic refrigerator, to do a harmonic analysis of regenerators, or to understand the physics of glaciers.

== See also ==
- Dissipation
- Heat transfer
- Turbulent kinetic energy
