= Irreversible process =

Process that cannot be undone or reversed

In thermodynamics, an irreversible process is a process impossible to reverse or undo. All complex natural processes are irreversible, although a phase transition at the coexistence temperature (e.g. melting of ice cubes in water) is well approximated as reversible.

A change in the thermodynamic state of a system and all of its surroundings cannot be precisely restored to its initial state by infinitesimal changes in some property of the system without expenditure of energy. A system that undergoes an irreversible process may still be capable of returning to its initial state. Because entropy is a state function, the change in entropy of the system is the same whether the process is reversible or irreversible. However, the impossibility occurs in restoring the environment to its own initial conditions. An irreversible process increases the total entropy of the system and its surroundings. The second law of thermodynamics can be used to determine whether a hypothetical process is reversible or not.

Intuitively, a process is reversible if there is no dissipation. For example, Joule expansion is irreversible because initially the system is not uniform. Initially, there is part of the system with gas in it, and part of the system with no gas. For dissipation to occur, there needs to be such a non uniformity. This is just the same as if in a system one section of the gas was hot, and the other cold. Then dissipation would occur; the temperature distribution would become uniform with no work being done, and this would be irreversible because you couldn't add or remove heat or change the volume to return the system to its initial state. Thus, if the system is always uniform, then the process is reversible, meaning that you can return the system to its original state by either adding or removing heat, doing work on the system, or letting the system do work. As another example, to approximate the expansion in an internal combustion engine as reversible, we would be assuming that the temperature and pressure uniformly change throughout the volume after the spark. Obviously, this is not true and there is a flame front and sometimes even engine knocking.

The phenomenon of irreversibility results from the fact that if a thermodynamic system, which is any system of sufficient complexity, of interacting molecules is brought from one thermodynamic state to another, the configuration or arrangement of the atoms and molecules in the system will change in a way that is not easily predictable. Some "transformation energy" will be used as the molecules of the "working body" do work on each other when they change from one state to another. During this transformation, there will be some heat energy loss or dissipation due to intermolecular friction and collisions. This energy will not be recoverable if the process is reversed.

Many biological processes that were once thought to be reversible have been found to actually be a pairing of two irreversible processes. Whereas a single enzyme was once believed to catalyze both the forward and reverse chemical changes, research has found that two separate enzymes of similar structure are typically needed to perform what results in a pair of thermodynamically irreversible processes.

== Absolute versus statistical reversibility ==
Thermodynamics defines the statistical behaviour of large numbers of entities, whose exact behavior is given by more specific laws. While the fundamental theoretical laws of physics are all time-reversible, experimentally the probability of real reversibility is low and the former state of system and surroundings is recovered only to certain extent (see: uncertainty principle). The reversibility of thermodynamics must be statistical in nature; that is, it must be merely highly unlikely, but not impossible, that a system will lower in entropy. In other words, time reversibility is fulfilled if the process happens the same way if time were to flow in reverse or the order of states in the process is reversed (the last state becomes the first and vice versa).

== History ==
The German physicist Rudolf Clausius, in the 1850s, was the first to mathematically quantify the discovery of irreversibility in nature through his introduction of the concept of entropy. In his 1854 memoir "On a Modified Form of the Second Fundamental Theorem in the Mechanical Theory of Heat," Clausius states:

It may, moreover, happen that instead of a descending transmission of heat accompanying, in the one and the same process, the ascending transmission, another permanent change may occur which has the peculiarity of not being reversible without either becoming replaced by a new permanent change of a similar kind, or producing a descending transmission of heat.

Simply, Clausius states that it is impossible for a system to transfer heat from a cooler body to a hotter body. For example, a cup of hot coffee placed in an area of room temperature (~72 °F) will transfer heat to its surroundings and thereby cool down with the temperature of the room slightly increasing (to ~72.3 °F). However, that same initial cup of coffee will never absorb heat from its surroundings, causing it to grow even hotter, with the temperature of the room decreasing (to ~71.7 °F). Therefore, the process of the coffee cooling down is irreversible unless extra energy is added to the system.

However, a paradox arose when attempting to reconcile microanalysis of a system with observations of its macrostate. Many processes are mathematically reversible in their microstate when analyzed using classical Newtonian mechanics. This paradox clearly taints microscopic explanations of macroscopic tendency towards equilibrium, such as James Clerk Maxwell's 1860 argument that molecular collisions entail an equalization of temperatures of mixed gases. From 1872 to 1875, Ludwig Boltzmann reinforced the statistical explanation of this paradox in the form of Boltzmann's entropy formula, stating that an increase of the number of possible microstates a system might be in, will increase the entropy of the system, making it less likely that the system will return to an earlier state. His formulas quantified the analysis done by William Thomson, 1st Baron Kelvin, who had argued that:

The equations of motion in abstract dynamics are perfectly reversible; any solution of these equations remains valid when the time variable t is replaced by –t. On the other hand, physical processes are irreversible: for example, the friction of solids, conduction of heat, and diffusion. Nevertheless, the principle of dissipation of energy is compatible with a molecular theory in which each particle is subject to the laws of abstract dynamics.

Another explanation of irreversible systems was presented by French mathematician Henri Poincaré. In 1890, he published his first explanation of nonlinear dynamics, also called chaos theory. Applying chaos theory to the second law of thermodynamics, the paradox of irreversibility can be explained in the errors associated with scaling from microstates to macrostates and the degrees of freedom used when making experimental observations. Sensitivity to initial conditions relating to the system and its environment at the microstate compounds into an exhibition of irreversible characteristics within the observable, physical realm.

Irreversible adiabatic process: If the cylinder is a perfect insulator, the initial top-left state cannot be reached anymore after it is changed to the one on the top-right. Instead, the state on the bottom left is assumed when going back to the original pressure because energy is converted into heat.

== Examples of irreversible processes ==
In the physical realm, many irreversible processes are present to which the inability to achieve 100% efficiency in energy transfer can be attributed. The following is a list of spontaneous events which contribute to the irreversibility of processes.

- Ageing (this claim is disputed, as ageing has been demonstrated to be reversed in mice. NAD+ and telomerase have also been demonstrated to reverse ageing.)
- Death
- Time
- Heat transfer through a finite temperature difference
- Friction
- Plastic deformation
- Flow of electric current through a resistance
- Magnetization or polarization with a hysteresis
- Unrestrained expansion of fluids
- Spontaneous chemical reactions
- Spontaneous mixing of matter of varying composition/states

A Joule expansion is an example of classical thermodynamics, as it is easy to work out the resulting increase in entropy. It occurs where a volume of gas is kept in one side of a thermally isolated container (via a small partition), with the other side of the container being evacuated; the partition between the two parts of the container is then opened, and the gas fills the whole container. The internal energy of the gas remains the same, while the volume increases. The original state cannot be recovered by simply compressing the gas to its original volume, since the internal energy will be increased by this compression. The original state can only be recovered by then cooling the re-compressed system, and thereby irreversibly heating the environment. The diagram to the right applies only if the first expansion is "free" (Joule expansion), i.e. there can be no atmospheric pressure outside the cylinder and no weight lifted.

== Complex systems ==
The difference between reversible and irreversible events has particular explanatory value in complex systems (such as living organisms, or ecosystems). According to the biologists Humberto Maturana and Francisco Varela, living organisms are characterized by autopoiesis, which enables their continued existence. More primitive forms of self-organizing systems have been described by the physicist and chemist Ilya Prigogine. In the context of complex systems, events which lead to the end of certain self-organising processes, like death, extinction of a species or the collapse of a meteorological system can be considered as irreversible. Even if a clone with the same organizational principle (e.g. identical DNA-structure) could be developed, this would not mean that the former distinct system comes back into being. Events to which the self-organizing capacities of organisms, species or other complex systems can adapt, like minor injuries or changes in the physical environment are reversible. However, adaptation depends on import of negentropy into the organism, thereby increasing irreversible processes in its environment. Ecological principles, like those of sustainability and the precautionary principle can be defined with reference to the concept of reversibility.

== See also ==
- Entropy production
- Entropy (arrow of time)
- Exergy
- Reversible process (thermodynamics)
- One way function
- Non-equilibrium thermodynamics
- Symmetry breaking
