= Inversion temperature =

Concept in thermodynamics

The inversion temperature in thermodynamics and cryogenics is the critical temperature below which a gas that is expanding at constant enthalpy will experience a temperature decrease, and above which will experience a temperature increase. This temperature change is known as the Joule–Thomson effect, and is exploited in the liquefaction of gases. Inversion temperature depends on the nature of the gas. The temperature of an ideal gas remains constant during expansion.

For a van der Waals gas we can calculate the enthalpy $H$ using statistical mechanics as

$$H = \frac{5}{2} N k_\mathrm B T + \frac{N^2}{V} (b k_\mathrm B T - 2a)$$

where $N$ is the number of molecules, $V$ is volume, $T$ is temperature (in the Kelvin scale), $k_\mathrm B$ is the Boltzmann constant, and $a$ and $b$ are constants depending on intermolecular forces and molecular volume, respectively.

From this equation, if enthalpy is kept constant and there is an increase of volume, temperature must change depending on the sign of $b k_\mathrm B T - 2a$. Therefore, our inversion temperature is given where the sign flips at zero, or

$$T_\text{inv} = \frac{2a}{b k_\mathrm B} = \frac{27}{4} T_\mathrm c$$,

where $T_\mathrm c$ is the critical temperature of the substance. So for $T > T_\text{inv}$, an expansion at constant enthalpy increases temperature as the work done by the repulsive interactions of the gas is dominant, and so the change in kinetic energy is positive. But for $T < T_\text{inv}$, expansion causes temperature to decrease because the work of attractive intermolecular forces dominates, giving a negative change in average molecular speed, and therefore kinetic energy.

== See also ==
- Critical point (thermodynamics)
- Phase transition
- Joule–Thomson effect
