= Adiabatic process =

Thermodynamic process in which no mass or heat is exchanged with surroundings

An adiabatic process (adiabatic from Ancient Greek ἀδιάβατος (adiábatos) 'impassable') is a type of thermodynamic process that occurs without transferring heat between the thermodynamic system and its environment. Unlike an isothermal process, an adiabatic process transfers energy to the surroundings only as work and/or as mass flow. As a key concept in thermodynamics, the adiabatic process supports the theory that explains the first law of thermodynamics. The opposite term to "adiabatic" is diabatic.

Some chemical and physical processes occur too rapidly for energy to enter or leave the system as heat, allowing a convenient "adiabatic approximation". For example, the adiabatic flame temperature uses this approximation to calculate the upper limit of flame temperature by assuming combustion loses no heat to its surroundings.

In meteorology, adiabatic expansion and cooling of moist air (which can be triggered by winds flowing up and over a mountain, for example) can cause the water-vapor pressure to exceed the saturation vapor pressure. Expansion and cooling beyond the saturation vapor pressure is often idealized as a pseudo-adiabatic process whereby excess vapor instantly precipitates into water droplets. The change in temperature of air undergoing pseudo-adiabatic expansion differs from air undergoing adiabatic expansion because latent heat is released by precipitation.

== Description ==
A process without transfer of thermal energy (heat) to or from a system, so that Q = 0, is called adiabatic, and such a system is said to be adiabatically isolated. The simplifying assumption frequently made is that a process is adiabatic. For example, the compression of a gas within a cylinder of an engine is assumed to occur so rapidly that on the time scale of the compression process, little of the system's energy can be transferred out as heat to the surroundings. Even though the cylinders are not insulated and are quite conductive, that process is idealized to be adiabatic. The same can be said to be true for the expansion process of such a system.

The assumption of adiabatic isolation is useful and often combined with other such idealizations to calculate a good first approximation of a system's behaviour. For example, according to Laplace, when sound travels in a gas, there is no time for heat conduction in the medium, and so the propagation of sound is adiabatic. For such an adiabatic process, the modulus of elasticity (Young's modulus) can be expressed as E = γP, where γ is the ratio of specific heats at constant pressure and at constant volume ( γ = C_{p}/C_{v}) and P is the pressure of the gas.

=== Various applications of the adiabatic assumption ===
For a closed system, one may write the first law of thermodynamics as ΔU = Q − W, where ΔU denotes the change of the system's internal energy, Q the quantity of energy added to it as heat, and W the work done by the system on its surroundings.

- If the system has such rigid walls that work cannot be transferred in or out (W = 0), and the walls are not adiabatic and energy is added in the form of heat (Q > 0), and there is no phase change, then the temperature of the system will rise.
- If the system has such rigid walls that pressure–volume work cannot be done, but the walls are adiabatic (Q = 0), and energy is added as isochoric (constant volume) work in the form of friction or the stirring of a viscous fluid within the system (W < 0), and there is no phase change, then the temperature of the system will rise.
- If the system walls are adiabatic (Q = 0) but not rigid (W ≠ 0), and, in a fictive idealized process, energy is added to the system in the form of frictionless, non-viscous pressure–volume work (W < 0), and there is no phase change, then the temperature of the system will rise. Such a process is called an isentropic process and is said to be "reversible". Ideally, if the process were reversed the energy could be recovered entirely as work done by the system. If the system contains a compressible gas and is reduced in volume, the uncertainty of the position of the gas is reduced, and seemingly would reduce the entropy of the system, but the temperature of the system will rise as the process is isentropic (ΔS = 0). Should the work be added in such a way that friction or viscous forces are operating within the system, then the process is not isentropic, and if there is no phase change, then the temperature of the system will rise, the process is said to be "irreversible", and the work added to the system is not entirely recoverable in the form of work.
- If the walls of a system are not adiabatic, and energy is transferred in as heat, entropy is transferred into the system with the heat. Such a process is neither adiabatic nor isentropic, having Q > 0, and ΔS > 0 according to the second law of thermodynamics.

Naturally occurring adiabatic processes are irreversible (entropy is produced).

The transfer of energy as work into an adiabatically isolated system can be imagined as being of two idealized extreme kinds. In one such kind, no entropy is produced within the system (no friction, viscous dissipation, etc.), and the work is only pressure-volume work (denoted by P dV). In nature, this ideal kind occurs only approximately because it demands an infinitely slow process and no sources of dissipation.

The other extreme kind of work is isochoric work (dV = 0), for which energy is added as work solely through friction or viscous dissipation within the system. A stirrer that transfers energy to a viscous fluid of an adiabatically isolated system with rigid walls, without phase change, will cause a rise in temperature of the fluid, but that work is not recoverable. Isochoric work is irreversible. The second law of thermodynamics observes that a natural process, of transfer of energy as work, always consists at least of isochoric work and often both of these extreme kinds of work. Every natural process, adiabatic or not, is irreversible, with ΔS > 0, as friction or viscosity are always present to some extent.

== Adiabatic compression and expansion ==
The adiabatic compression of a gas causes a rise in temperature of the gas. Adiabatic expansion against pressure, or a spring, causes a drop in temperature. In contrast, free expansion is an isothermal process for an ideal gas.

=== Adiabatic compression ===
Adiabatic compression occurs when the pressure of a gas is increased by work done on it by its surroundings, e.g., a piston compressing a gas contained within a cylinder and raising the temperature where in many practical situations heat conduction through walls can be slow compared with the compression time. This finds practical application in diesel engines which rely on the lack of heat dissipation during the compression stroke to elevate the fuel vapor temperature sufficiently to ignite it.

Adiabatic compression occurs in the Earth's atmosphere when an air mass descends, for example, in a Katabatic wind, Foehn wind, or Chinook wind flowing downhill over a mountain range. When a parcel of air descends, the pressure on the parcel increases. Because of this increase in pressure, the parcel's volume decreases and its temperature increases as work is done on the parcel of air, thus increasing its internal energy, which manifests itself by a rise in the temperature of that mass of air. The parcel of air can only slowly dissipate the energy by conduction or radiation (heat), and to a first approximation it can be considered adiabatically isolated and the process an adiabatic process.

=== Adiabatic expansion ===
Adiabatic expansion occurs when the pressure on an adiabatically isolated system is decreased, allowing it to expand in size, thus causing it to do work on its surroundings. When the pressure applied on a parcel of gas is reduced, the gas in the parcel is allowed to expand; as the volume increases, the temperature falls as its internal energy decreases. Adiabatic expansion occurs in the Earth's atmosphere with orographic lifting and lee waves, and this can form pilei or lenticular clouds.

Due in part to adiabatic expansion in mountainous areas, snowfall actually occurs in some parts of the Sahara desert.

Adiabatic expansion does not have to involve a fluid. One technique used to reach very low temperatures (thousandths and even millionths of a degree above absolute zero) is via adiabatic demagnetisation, where the change in magnetic field on a magnetic material is used to provide adiabatic expansion. Also, the contents of an expanding universe can be described (to first order) as an adiabatically expanding fluid. (See heat death of the universe.)

Rising magma also undergoes adiabatic expansion before eruption, particularly significant in the case of magmas that rise quickly from great depths such as kimberlites.

In the Earth's convecting mantle (the asthenosphere) beneath the lithosphere, the mantle temperature is approximately an adiabat. The slight decrease in temperature with shallowing depth is due to the decrease in pressure the shallower the material is in the Earth.

Such temperature changes can be quantified using the ideal gas law, or the hydrostatic equation for atmospheric processes.

In practice, no process is truly adiabatic. Many processes rely on a large difference in time scales of the process of interest and the rate of heat dissipation across a system boundary, and thus are approximated by using an adiabatic assumption. There is always some heat loss, as no perfect insulators exist.

== Ideal gas (reversible process) ==
For a simple substance, during an adiabatic process in which the volume increases, the internal energy of the working substance must decrease.

The mathematical equation for an ideal gas undergoing a reversible (i.e., no entropy generation) adiabatic process can be represented by the polytropic process equation

$$P\ V^\gamma = \mathsf{constant}\ ,$$

where P is pressure, V is volume, and γ is the adiabatic index or heat capacity ratio defined as

$$\gamma = \frac{C_P}{C_V} = \frac{f + 2}{f} ~.$$

Here C_{P} is the specific heat for constant pressure, C_{V} is the specific heat for constant volume, and f is the number of degrees of freedom (3 for a monatomic gas, 5 for a diatomic gas or a gas of linear molecules such as carbon dioxide).

For a monatomic ideal gas, γ = 5/3, and for a diatomic gas (such as nitrogen and oxygen, the main components of air), γ = 7/5. Note that the above formula is only applicable to classical ideal gases (that is, gases far above absolute zero temperature) and not Bose–Einstein or Fermi gases.

One can also use the ideal gas law to rewrite the above relationship between P and V as

$$\begin{align}
P^{1-\gamma}\ T^\gamma &= \mathsf{constant}\ ,\\
T\ V^{\gamma - 1} &= \mathsf{constant} ~.
\end{align}$$

where T is the absolute or thermodynamic temperature.

=== Example of adiabatic compression ===
The compression stroke in a gasoline engine can be used as an example of adiabatic compression. The model assumptions are: the uncompressed volume of the cylinder is one litre (1 L = 1000 cm^{3} = 0.001 m^{3} ); the gas within is the air consisting of molecular nitrogen and oxygen only (thus a diatomic gas with 5 degrees of freedom, and so γ = 7/5 ); the compression ratio of the engine is 10:1 (that is, the 1 L volume of uncompressed gas is reduced to 0.1 L by the piston); and the uncompressed gas is at approximately room temperature and pressure (a warm room temperature of ~27 °C, or 300 K, and a pressure of 1 bar = 100 kPa, i.e. typical sea-level atmospheric pressure).

$$\begin{align}
P_1 V_1^\gamma &= \mathsf{constant}_1 \\
& = 100\,000~\text{Pa} \times (0.001~\mathsf{m}^3)^\frac75 \\
& = 10^5 \times 6.31 \times 10^{-5}~\mathsf{Pa}\,\mathsf{m}^{21/5} \\
& = 6.31~\text{Pa}\,\mathsf{m}^{21/5}\ ,
\end{align}$$

so the adiabatic constant for this example is about 6.31 Pa·m^{4.2} .

The gas is now compressed to a 0.1 L (0.0001 m^{3}) volume, which we assume happens quickly enough that no heat enters or leaves the gas through the walls. The adiabatic constant remains the same, but with the resulting pressure unknown

$$\begin{align}
P_2 V_2^\gamma &= \mathsf{constant}_1 \\
&= 6.31~\mathsf{Pa}\,\mathsf{m}^{21/5} \\
&= P \times (0.0001~\mathsf{m}^3)^\frac75,
\end{align}$$

We can now solve for the final pressure

$$\begin{align}
P_2 &= P_1 \left( \frac{V_1}{V_2} \right)^\gamma \\
&= 100\ 000~\mathsf{Pa} \times {10}^{7/5} \\
&= 2.51 \times 10^6~\mathsf{Pa} \ ,
\end{align}$$

or 25.1 bar. This pressure increase is more than a simple 10:1 compression ratio would indicate; this is because the gas is not only compressed, but the work done to compress the gas also increases its internal energy, which manifests itself by a rise in the gas temperature and an additional rise in pressure above what would result from a simplistic calculation of 10 times the original pressure.

We can solve for the temperature of the compressed gas in the engine cylinder as well, using the ideal gas law, P V = n R T (n is amount of gas in moles and R the gas constant for that gas). Our initial conditions being 100 kPa of pressure, 1 L volume, and 300 K of temperature, our experimental constant (n R ) is:

$$\begin{align}
\frac{P\ V}{T} &= \mathsf{constant}_2 \\
&= \frac{10^5~\mathsf{Pa} \times 10^{-3}~\mathsf{m}^3}{300~\mathsf{K}} \\
&= 0.333~\mathsf{Pa}\ \mathsf{m}^3\mathsf{K}^{-1} ~.
\end{align}$$

We know the compressed gas has V = 0.1 L and P = 2.51×10^{6} Pa, so we can solve for temperature:

$$\begin{align}
T &= \frac{P\ V}{\mathsf{constant}_2} \\
&= \frac{2.51 \times 10^6~\mathsf{Pa} \times 10^{-4}~\text{m}^3}{0.333~\mathsf{Pa}\ \mathsf{m}^3\mathsf{K}^{-1}} \\
&= 753~\mathsf{K}.
\end{align}$$

That is a final temperature of 753 K, or 479 °C, or 896 °F, well above the ignition point of many fuels. This is why a high-compression engine requires fuels specially formulated to not self-ignite (which would cause engine knocking when operated under these conditions of temperature and pressure), or that a supercharger with an intercooler to provide a pressure boost but with a lower temperature rise would be advantageous. A diesel engine operates under even more extreme conditions, with compression ratios of 16:1 or more being typical, in order to provide a very high gas pressure, which ensures immediate ignition of the injected fuel.

=== Adiabatic free expansion of a gas ===
For an adiabatic free expansion of an ideal gas, the gas is contained in an insulated container and then allowed to expand in a vacuum. Because there is no external pressure for the gas to expand against, the work done by or on the system is zero. Since this process does not involve any heat transfer or work, the first law of thermodynamics then implies that the net internal energy change of the system is zero. For an ideal gas, the temperature remains constant because the internal energy only depends on temperature in that case. Since at constant temperature, the entropy is proportional to the volume, the entropy increases in this case, therefore this process is irreversible.

=== Derivation of P–V relation for adiabatic compression and expansion ===
The definition of an adiabatic process is that heat transfer to the system is zero, δQ = 0. Then, according to the first law of thermodynamics,

| $$\mathrm{d}U + \delta W = \delta Q = 0\ ,$$ | a1 |

where dU is the change in the internal energy of the system and δW is work done by the system. Any work (δW) done must be done at the expense of internal energy U, since no heat δQ is being supplied from the surroundings. Pressure–volume work δW done by the system is defined as

| $$\delta W = P \ \mathrm{d}V ~.$$ | a2 |

However, P does not remain constant during an adiabatic process but instead changes along with V.

It is desired to know how the values of dP and dV relate to each other as the adiabatic process proceeds. For an ideal gas (recall ideal gas law PV = nRT) the internal energy is given by

| $$U = \alpha\ n\ R\ T = \alpha\ P\ V\ ,$$ | a3 |

where α is the number of degrees of freedom divided by 2, R is the universal gas constant and n is the number of moles in the system (a constant).

Differentiating equation (a3) yields

| $$\begin{align} \mathrm{d} U &= \alpha\ n\ R\ \mathrm{d}T\\ & = \alpha\ \mathrm{d} (P\ V)\\ & = \alpha\ (P \ \mathrm{d}V + V \ \mathrm{d}P) ~. \end{align}$$ | a4 |

Equation (a4) is often expressed as dU = n C_{V} dT because C_{V} = α R .

Now substitute equations (a2) and (a4) into equation (a1) to obtain

$$-P\ \mathrm{d}V = \alpha\ P\ \mathrm{d}V + \alpha\ V\ \mathrm{d}P\ ,$$

factor −P dV:

$$-(\alpha + 1)\ P\ \mathrm{d}V = \alpha V\ \mathrm{d}P\ ,$$

and divide both sides by P V :

$$-(\alpha + 1)\ \frac{\mathrm{d}V}{V} = \alpha\ \frac{\mathrm{d}P}{P} ~.$$

After integrating the left and right sides from V_{0} to V and from P_{0} to P and changing the sides respectively,

$$\ln \left( \frac{P}{P_0} \right) = -\frac{\alpha + 1}{\alpha}\ \ln \left( \frac{V}{V_0} \right) ~.$$

Exponentiate both sides, substitute (α + 1)/α with γ, the heat capacity ratio

$$\left( \frac{P}{P_0} \right) = \left( \frac{V}{V_0} \right)^{-\gamma}\ ,$$

and eliminate the negative sign to obtain

$$\left( \frac{P}{P_0} \right) = \left( \frac{V_0}{V} \right)^\gamma ~.$$

Therefore,

$$\left( \frac{P}{P_0} \right) \left( \frac{V}{V_0} \right)^\gamma = 1\ ,$$

and

$$P_0\ V_0^\gamma = P\ V^\gamma = \mathsf{constant} ~.$$

| $$\Delta U = \alpha\ R\ n\ T_2 - \alpha\ R\ n\ T_1 = \alpha\ R\ n\ \Delta T ~.$$ | b1 |

At the same time, the work done by the pressure–volume changes as a result from this process, is equal to

| $$W = \int_{V_1}^{V_2}\ P\ \mathrm{d}V ~.$$ | b2 |

Since we require the process to be adiabatic, the following equation needs to be true

| $$\Delta U + W = 0 ~.$$ | b3 |

By the previous derivation,

| $$P\ V^\gamma = \mathsf{constant} = P_1\ V_1^\gamma ~.$$ | b4 |

Rearranging (b4) gives

$$P = P_1\ \left(\frac{V_1}{V} \right)^\gamma ~.$$

Substituting this into (b2) gives

$$W = \int_{V_1}^{V_2} P_1\ \left(\frac{V_1}{V} \right)^\gamma\ \mathrm{d}V ~.$$

Integrating, we obtain the expression for work,

$$\begin{align}
W &= P_1\ V_1^\gamma\ \frac{V_2^{1-\gamma} - V_1^{1-\gamma}}{1 - \gamma} \\[1ex]
&= \frac{P_2\ V_2 - P_1\ V_1}{1 - \gamma}.
\end{align}$$

Substituting γ = (α + 1)/α in the second term,

$$W = -\alpha\ P_1\ V_1^\gamma\ \left( V_2^{1-\gamma} - V_1^{1-\gamma} \right) ~.$$

Rearranging,

$$W = -\alpha\ P_1\ V_1\ \left( \left( \frac{V_2}{V_1} \right)^{1-\gamma} - 1 \right) ~.$$

Using the ideal gas law and assuming a constant molar quantity (as often happens in practical cases),

$$W = -\alpha\ n\ R\ T_1 \left( \left( \frac{V_2}{V_1} \right)^{1-\gamma} - 1 \right) ~.$$

By the continuous formula,

$$\frac{P_2}{P_1} = \left(\frac{V_2}{V_1}\right)^{-\gamma}\ ,$$

or

$$\left(\frac{P_2}{P_1}\right)^{-\frac{1}{\gamma}} = \frac{V_2}{V_1} ~.$$

Substituting into the previous expression for W,

$$W = -\alpha\ n\ R\ T_1 \left( \left( \frac{P_2}{P_1} \right)^{\frac{\gamma-1}{\gamma}} - 1 \right) ~.$$

Substituting this expression and (b1) in (b3) gives

$$\alpha\ n\ R\ (T_2 - T_1) = \alpha\ n\ R\ T_1\ \left( \left( \frac{P_2}{P_1} \right)^{\frac{\gamma-1}{\gamma}} - 1 \right) ~.$$

Simplifying,

$$\begin{align}
T_2 - T_1 &=  T_1\ \left( \left( \frac{P_2}{P_1} \right)^{\frac{\gamma-1}{\gamma}} - 1 \right)\ , \\
\frac{T_2}{T_1} - 1 &=  \left( \frac{P_2}{P_1} \right)^{\frac{\gamma-1}{\gamma}} - 1\ , \\
T_2 &= T_1\ \left( \frac{P_2}{P_1} \right)^{\frac{\gamma-1}{\gamma}} ~.
\end{align}$$

=== Derivation of discrete formula and work expression ===
The change in internal energy of a system, measured from state 1 to state 2, is equal to

At the same time, the work done by the pressure–volume changes as a result from this process, is equal to

| $$W = \int_{V_1}^{V_2}\ P\ \mathrm{d}V ~.$$ | c2 |

Since we require the process to be adiabatic, the following equation needs to be true

| $$\Delta U + W = 0 ~.$$ | c3 |

By the previous derivation,

| $$P\ V^\gamma = \text{constant} = P_1\ V_1^\gamma ~.$$ | c4 |

Rearranging (c4) gives

$$P = P_1\ \left(\frac{V_1}{V} \right)^\gamma ~.$$

Substituting this into (c2) gives

$$W = \int_{V_1}^{V_2} P_1\ \left(\frac{V_1}{V} \right)^\gamma\ \mathrm{d}V ~.$$

Integrating we obtain the expression for work,

$$W = P_1\ V_1^\gamma \frac{V_2^{1-\gamma} - V_1^{1-\gamma}}{1 - \gamma} = \frac{P_2\ V_2 - P_1\ V_1}{1 - \gamma} ~.$$

Substituting γ = (α + 1)/α in second term,

$$W = -\alpha\ P_1 V_1^\gamma\ \left( V_2^{1-\gamma} - V_1^{1-\gamma} \right) ~.$$

Rearranging,

$$W = -\alpha\ P_1\ V_1\ \left( \left( \frac{V_2}{V_1} \right)^{1-\gamma} - 1 \right) ~.$$

Using the ideal gas law and assuming a constant molar quantity (as often happens in practical cases),

$$W = -\alpha\ n\ R\ T_1\ \left( \left( \frac{V_2}{V_1} \right)^{1-\gamma} - 1 \right) ~.$$

By the continuous formula,

$$\frac{P_2}{P_1} = \left(\frac{V_2}{V_1}\right)^{-\gamma}\ ,$$

or

$$\left(\frac{P_2}{P_1}\right)^{-\frac{1}{\gamma}} = \frac{V_2}{V_1} ~.$$

Substituting into the previous expression for W,

$$W = -\alpha\ n\ R\ T_1\ \left( \left( \frac{P_2}{P_1} \right)^{\frac{\gamma-1}{\gamma}} - 1 \right) ~.$$

Substituting this expression and (c1) in (c3) gives

$$\alpha\ n\ R\ (T_2 - T_1) = \alpha\ n\ R\ T_1\ \left( \left( \frac{P_2}{P_1} \right)^{\frac{\gamma-1}{\gamma}} - 1 \right) ~.$$

Simplifying,

$$\begin{align}
T_2 - T_1 &=  T_1\ \left( \left( \frac{P_2}{P_1} \right)^{\frac{\gamma-1}{\gamma}} - 1 \right)\ , \\
\frac{T_2}{T_1} - 1 &=  \left( \frac{P_2}{P_1} \right)^{\frac{\gamma-1}{\gamma}} - 1\ , \\
T_2 &= T_1\ \left( \frac{P_2}{P_1} \right)^{\frac{\gamma-1}{\gamma}} ~.
\end{align}$$

== Graphing adiabats ==
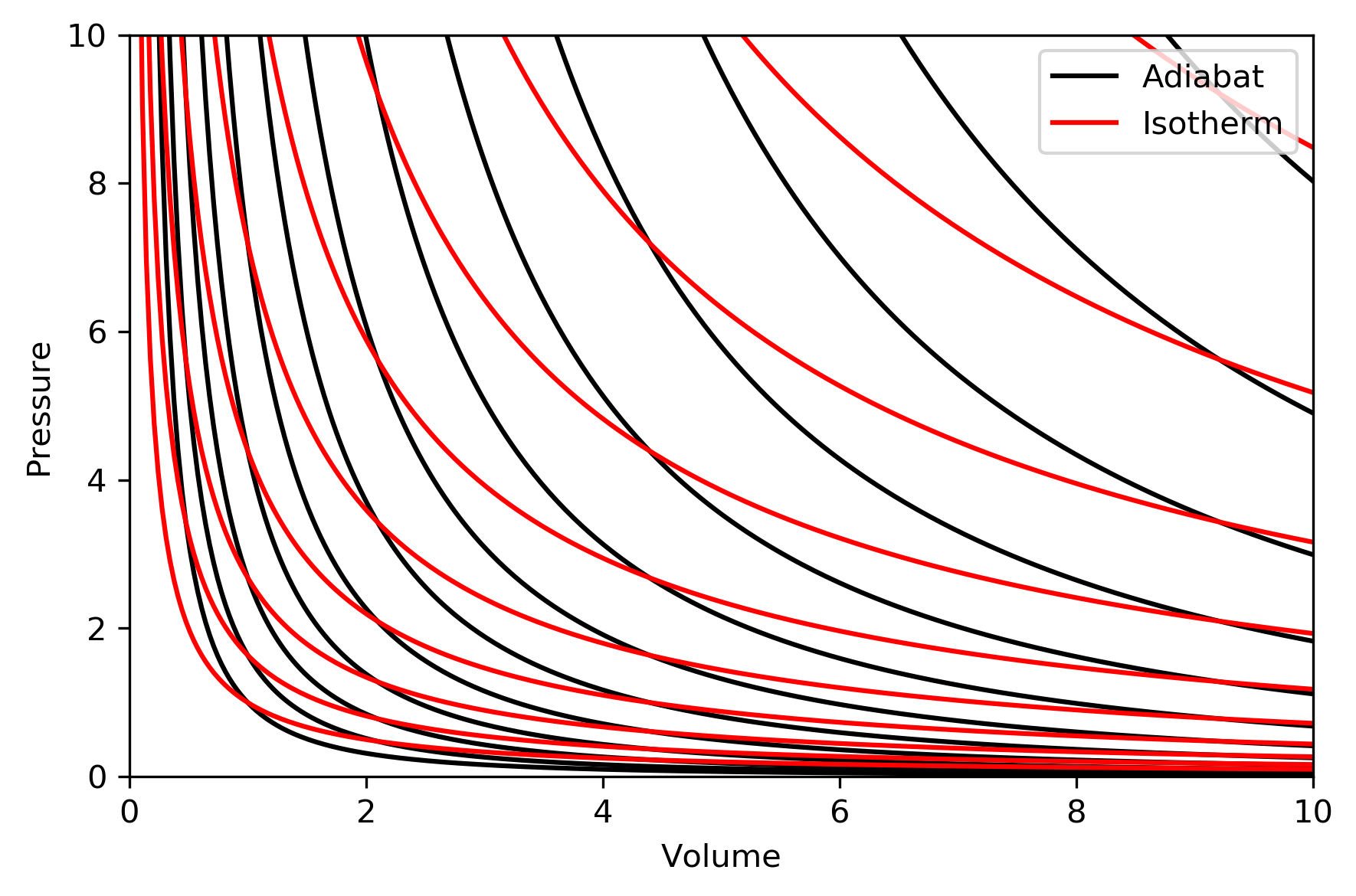
P–V diagram with a superposition of adiabats and isotherms: The isotherms are the red curves and the adiabats are the black curves.; The adiabats are isentropic.; Volume is the horizontal axis and pressure is the vertical axis.

An adiabat is a curve of constant entropy in a diagram. Some properties of adiabats on a P – V diagram are indicated. These properties may be read from the classical behaviour of ideal gases, except in the region where P V becomes small (low temperature), where quantum effects become important.

1. Every adiabat asymptotically approaches both the V axis and the P axis (just like isotherms).
2. Each adiabat intersects each isotherm exactly once.
3. An adiabat looks similar to an isotherm, except that during an expansion, an adiabat loses more pressure than an isotherm, so it has a steeper inclination (more vertical).
4. If isotherms are concave towards the north-east direction (45° from V axis), then adiabats are concave towards the east north-east (31° from V axisaxis).
5. If adiabats and isotherms are graphed at regular intervals of entropy and temperature, respectively (like altitude on a contour map), then as the eye moves towards the axes (towards the south-west), it sees the density of isotherms stay constant, but it sees the density of adiabats grow. The exception is very near absolute zero, where the density of adiabats drops sharply and they become rare (see Nernst's theorem).

== Etymology ==
The term adiabatic (/ˌædiəˈbætɪk/) is an anglicization of the Greek term ἀδιάβατος "impassable" (used by Xenophon of rivers). It is used in the thermodynamic sense by Rankine (1866), and adopted by Maxwell in 1871 (explicitly attributing the term to Rankine). The etymological origin corresponds here to an impossibility of transfer of energy as heat and of transfer of matter across the wall.

The Greek word ἀδιάβατος is formed from privative ἀ- ("not") and διαβατός, "passable", in turn deriving from διά ("through"), and βαῖνειν ("to walk, go, come").

Furthermore, in atmospheric thermodynamics, a diabatic process is one in which heat is exchanged. An adiabatic process is the opposite – a process in which no heat is exchanged.

== Conceptual significance in thermodynamic theory ==
The adiabatic process has been important for thermodynamics since its early days. It was important in the work of Joule because it provided a way of nearly directly relating quantities of heat and work.

Energy can enter or leave a thermodynamic system enclosed by walls that prevent mass transfer only as heat or work. Therefore, a quantity of work in such a system can be related almost directly to an equivalent quantity of heat in a cycle of two limbs. The first limb is an isochoric adiabatic work process increasing the system's internal energy; the second, an isochoric and workless heat transfer returning the system to its original state. Accordingly, Rankine measured quantity of heat in units of work, rather than as a calorimetric quantity. In 1854, Rankine used a quantity that he called "the thermodynamic function" that later was called entropy, and at that time he wrote also of the "curve of no transmission of heat", which he later called an adiabatic curve. Besides its two isothermal limbs, Carnot's cycle has two adiabatic limbs.

For the foundations of thermodynamics, the conceptual importance of this was emphasized by Bryan, by Carathéodory, and by Born. The reason is that calorimetry presupposes a type of temperature as already defined before the statement of the first law of thermodynamics, such as one based on empirical scales. Such a presupposition involves making the distinction between empirical temperature and absolute temperature. Rather, the definition of absolute thermodynamic temperature is best left till the second law is available as a conceptual basis.

In the eighteenth century, the law of conservation of energy was not yet fully formulated or established, and the nature of heat was debated. One approach to these problems was to regard heat, measured by calorimetry, as a primary substance that is conserved in quantity. By the middle of the nineteenth century, it was recognized as a form of energy, and the law of conservation of energy was thereby also recognized. The view that eventually established itself, and is currently regarded as right, is that the law of conservation of energy is a primary axiom, and that heat is to be analyzed as consequential. In this light, heat cannot be a component of the total energy of a single body because it is not a state variable but, rather, a variable that describes a transfer between two bodies. The adiabatic process is important because it is a logical ingredient of this current view.

== Divergent usages of the word adiabatic ==
This present article is written from the viewpoint of macroscopic thermodynamics, and the word adiabatic is used in this article in the traditional way of thermodynamics, introduced by Rankine. It is pointed out in the present article that, for example, if a compression of a gas is rapid, then there is little time for heat transfer to occur, even when the gas is not adiabatically isolated by a definite wall. In this sense, a rapid compression of a gas is sometimes approximately or loosely said to be adiabatic, though often far from isentropic, even when the gas is not adiabatically isolated by a definite wall.

Some authors, like Pippard, recommend using "adiathermal" to refer to processes where no heat-exchange occurs (such as Joule expansion), and "adiabatic" to reversible quasi-static adiathermal processes (so that rapid compression of a gas is not "adiabatic"). And Laidler has summarized the complicated etymology of "adiabatic".

Quantum mechanics and quantum statistical mechanics, however, use the word adiabatic in a very different sense, one that can at times seem almost opposite to the classical thermodynamic sense. In quantum theory, the word adiabatic can mean something perhaps near isentropic, or perhaps near quasi-static, but the usage of the word is very different between the two disciplines.

On the one hand, in quantum theory, if a perturbative element of compressive work is done almost infinitely slowly (that is to say quasi-statically), it is said to have been done adiabatically. The idea is that the shapes of the eigenfunctions change slowly and continuously, so that no quantum jump is triggered, and the change is virtually reversible. While the occupation numbers are unchanged, nevertheless there is change in the energy levels of one-to-one corresponding, pre- and post-compression, eigenstates. Thus a perturbative element of work has been done without heat transfer and without introduction of random change within the system. For example, Max Born writes

Actually, it is usually the 'adiabatic' case with which we have to do: i.e. the limiting case where the external force (or the reaction of the parts of the system on each other) acts very slowly. In this case, to a very high approximation

$$c_1^2 = 1, ~ c_2^2=0, ~ c_3^2=0,\ ... ~.$$

that is, there is no probability for a transition, and the system is in the initial state after cessation of the perturbation. Such a slow perturbation is therefore reversible, as it is classically.

On the other hand, in quantum theory, if a perturbative element of compressive work is done rapidly, it changes the occupation numbers and energies of the eigenstates in proportion to the transition moment integral and in accordance with time-dependent perturbation theory, as well as perturbing the functional form of the eigenstates themselves. In that theory, such a rapid change is said not to be adiabatic, and the contrary word diabatic is applied to it.

Recent research suggests that the power absorbed from the perturbation corresponds to the rate of these non-adiabatic transitions. This corresponds to the classical process of energy transfer in the form of heat, but with the relative time scales reversed in the quantum case. Quantum adiabatic processes occur over relatively long time scales, while classical adiabatic processes occur over relatively short time scales. It should also be noted that the concept of 'heat' (in reference to the quantity of thermal energy transferred) breaks down at the quantum level, and the specific form of energy (typically electromagnetic) must be considered instead. The small or negligible absorption of energy from the perturbation in a quantum adiabatic process provides a good justification for identifying it as the quantum analogue of adiabatic processes in classical thermodynamics, and for the reuse of the term.

In classical thermodynamics, such a rapid change would still be called adiabatic because the system is adiabatically isolated, and there is no transfer of energy as heat. The strong irreversibility of the change, due to viscosity or other entropy production, does not impinge on this classical usage.

Thus for a mass of gas, in macroscopic thermodynamics, words are so used that a compression is sometimes loosely or approximately said to be adiabatic if it is rapid enough to avoid significant heat transfer, even if the system is not adiabatically isolated. But in quantum statistical theory, a compression is not called adiabatic if it is rapid, even if the system is adiabatically isolated in the classical thermodynamic sense of the term. The words are used differently in the two disciplines, as stated just above.

== See also ==
General

- Fire piston
- Heat burst

Related physics topics

- First law of thermodynamics
- Entropy (classical thermodynamics)
- Adiabatic conductivity
- Adiabatic lapse rate
- Total air temperature
- Magnetic refrigeration
- Berry phase

Related thermodynamic processes

- Cyclic process
- Isobaric process
- Isenthalpic process
- Isentropic process
- Isochoric process
- Isothermal process
- Polytropic process
- Quasistatic process
