= Outline of energy =

Overview of and topical guide to energy

The following outline is provided as an overview of and topical guide to energy:

Energy – in physics, this is an indirectly observed quantity often understood as the ability of a physical system to do work on other physical systems. Since work is defined as a force acting through a distance (a length of space), energy is always equivalent to the ability to exert force (a pull or a push) against an object that is moving along a definite path of certain length.

== Forms of energy ==
- Chemical energy – Energy released from chemical substances
- Electrical energy – Energy related to forces on, and movement of, charged particles
- Free energy – State function whose change relates to the system's maximal work output
- Geothermal energy – Thermal energy generated and stored in the Earth
- Gravitational energy – energy from gravitational fields
- Ionization energy – energy that binds an electron to its atom or molecule
- Kinetic energy – (≥0), energy of the motion of a body
- Magnetic energy – energy from magnetic fields
- Mechanical energy – The sum of (usually macroscopic) kinetic and potential energies
- Mechanical wave – (≥0), a form of mechanical energy propagated by a material's oscillations
- Nuclear binding energy – energy that binds nucleons to form the atomic nucleus
- Potential energy – energy possessed by a body by virtue of its position relative to others, stresses within itself, electric charge, and other factors.
  - Elastic energy – energy of deformation of a material (or its container) exhibiting a restorative force
  - Gravitational energy – potential energy associated with a gravitational field.
  - Nuclear potential energy
- Radiant energy – (≥0), energy of electromagnetic radiation including light and of gravitational radiation
- Renewable energy – energy from renewable natural resources that are replenished on a human timescale
- Rest energy – (≥0) given by E = mc^{2}, where m is an object's rest mass
- Solar energy
- Surface energy
- Sustainable energy
- Thermal energy – a microscopic, disordered equivalent of mechanical energy
  - Heat – an amount of thermal energy being transferred (in a given process) in the direction of decreasing temperature
- Work (physics) – an amount of energy being energy transferred in a given process due to displacement in the direction of an applied force
- Electric power
- Electricity

== Measurement ==
=== Units ===
List of common units for energy. Official or common symbol in brackets after name and exact or approximate value of unit in joule in brackets after description.

==== SI unit ====
- Joule (J) – the SI-unit for energy. Also called newton meter, watt second, or coulomb volt.

==== Other metric units ====
- Kilowatt-hour (kW·h) – corresponds to one kilowatt of power being used over a period of one hour (3.6 MJ).
- Calorie (cal) – equal to the energy need to raise the temperature of one gram of water by one degree Celsius (~4.184 J).
- Erg (erg) – unit of energy and mechanical work in the centimetre-gram-second (CGS) system of units (10^{−7} J).

==== Imperial or US Customary units ====
- British thermal unit (BTU) – equal to the energy need to raise the temperature of one pound of water by one degree Fahrenheit (~1055 J).
- Therm (thm) – unit of heat energy. In the US gas industry it is defined as exactly 100,000 BTU_{59 °F}. It is approximately the heat equivalent of burning 100 cubic feet (2.8 m^{3}) of natural gas (~105.5 MJ).
- Quad – unit of energy equal to 10^{15} (a short-scale quadrillion) BTU.
- Foot-pound (ft·lbf or ft·lbf) – unit of mechanical work, or energy, although in scientific fields one commonly uses joule (~1.356 J).

==== Other units ====
- Electronvolt (eV) – the amount of energy gained by a single unbound electron when it falls through an electrostatic potential difference of one volt (~1.60 × 10^{−19} J).
- Planck energy (E_{P}) – natural unit of energy common in particle physics (~1.96×10^{9} J).
- Barrel of oil equivalent (BOE) – energy unit equal to the energy released when burning one barrel (159 litres) of oil (~6.12 GJ).
- Tonne of oil equivalent (toe) – energy unit equal to the energy released when burning one tonne of oil (~42 GJ).

=== Related units and concepts ===
- Volt
- Ampere
- Coulomb
- Efficient energy use
- Energy recovery
- Energy recycling
- Enthalpy
- EU energy label
- Fill factor – defined as the ratio of the maximum power (Vmp x Jmp) divided by the short-circuit current (Isc) and open-circuit voltage (Voc) in light current density – voltage (J-V) characteristics of solar cells.
- Gigaton – Metric Unit of mass, equal to 1,000,000,000 (1 billion) metric tons, 1,000,000,000,000 (1 trillion) kilograms
  - Any of various units of energy, such as gigatons of TNT equivalent, gigatons of coal equivalent, gigatons petroleum equivalent.
- Gray (unit) – (symbol: Gy), is the SI unit of energy for the absorbed dose of radiation. One gray is the absorption of one joule of radiation energy by one kilogram of matter. One gray equals 100 rad, an older unit.
- Heat
- Mass–energy equivalence – where mass has an energy equivalence, and energy has a mass equivalence
- Megawatt
- Net energy gain
- Power factor – of an AC electric power system is defined as the ratio of the real power to the apparent power.
- Waste-to-energy
  - Waste-to-energy plant
- Watt
- Voltage
- Zero-energy building

== Energy industry ==
Energy industry

- Worldwide energy supply, outline by country/region
- World energy resources and consumption
- List of energy resources, substances like fuels, petroleum products and electricity
- Energy crisis, the need to conserve energy resources
- Energy development, development of energy resources — ongoing effort to provide abundant and accessible energy, through knowledge, skills and construction
- Embodied energy, the sum total of energy expended to deliver a good or service as it travels through the economy
- Energy conservation, tips for conserving energy resources
- Energy economics, as the foundation of other relationships
- Energy policy, government policies and plans for energy supply
- Energy storage, methods commonly used to store energy resources for later use
- Energy system, an interpretation the energy sector in system terms
- Ecological energetics
- Energy balance
- Energy speculation
- Free energy suppression conspiracy theory
- Future energy development – Provides a general overview of future energy development.
- History of perpetual motion machines
- Hubbert peak theory, also known as peak oil – the theory that world oil production will peak (or has peaked), and will then rapidly decline, with a corresponding rapid increase in prices.
- Primary production
- Power harvesting
- Renewable energy development

=== Energy infrastructure ===
See especially Category:Electric power and Category:Fuels for a large number of conventional energy related topics.

- Energy storage
- Electricity generation
- Electricity retailing
- Grid energy storage
- Liquified natural gas
- Microwave power transmission
- Power station
- Power supply
- Power transmission
- Underground power station
- Power outage
- Uninterruptible power supply

=== Energy applications ===
- Biofuel
- Distributed generation
- Electric vehicle
- Hybrid vehicle
- Hydrogen vehicle
- Maglev
- Passive solar building design
- Steam engine
- Vactrain

== History of energy ==
History of energy

- History of the energy industry
  - History of coal
    - History of coal mining
  - Electricity § History
    - History of electromagnetic theory
    - History of electrical engineering
    - History of electronic engineering
    - History of the electric generator
    - History of the electric motor
      - Timeline of the electric motor
    - History of electric power transmission
  - History of nuclear power
  - History of petroleum
    - History of the petroleum industry
  - History of renewable energy
    - History of alternative energy
    - History of hydropower
    - History of solar cells
      - Growth of photovoltaics
    - History of sustainability
    - History of wind power
    - Timeline of sustainable energy research 2020–present
  - History of the steam engine
    - Steam power during the Industrial Revolution

== Physics of energy ==
- Energy
- Activation energy, explains the differences in the speeds of various chemical reactions
- Bioenergetics
- Chemical energetics
- Energy in physical cosmology
- Energy in Earth science that is responsible for the macroscopic transformations on the planet Earth
- Electricity
- Exergy
- Green energy
- Orders of magnitude (energy), list describing various energy levels between 10^{−31} joules and 10^{70} joules
- Thermodynamics
- Perpetual motion
- Heat
- History of energy
- Forms of energy, the forms in which energy can be defined
- Energy transformation, relating to energy's changes from one form to another.
- Energy (signal processing), the inner product of a signal in the time domain
- Energy density spectrum, relating to the distribution of signal energy over frequencies.
- Potential energy, the form of energy that is due to position of an object
- Kinetic energy, the form of energy as a consequence of the motion of an object or its constituents
- Mechanical energy, the potential energy and kinetic energy present in the components of a mechanical system
- Binding energy, a concept explaining how the constituents of atoms or molecules are bound together
- Bond energy, a measure of the strength of a chemical bond
- Nuclear energy, energy that is the consequence of decomposition or combination of atomic nuclei
- Osmotic power, also salinity gradient power or blue energy, the energy available from the difference in the salt concentration between seawater and river water
- Gibbs free energy, a related concept in chemical thermodynamics that incorporates entropy considerations
- Helmholtz free energy, a thermodynamic potential that measures the "useful" work obtainable from a closed thermodynamic system at a constant temperature, useful for studying explosive chemical reactions
- Elastic energy, which causes or is released by the elastic distortion of a solid or a fluid
- Ionization energy (IE), the energy required to strip an atom of an electron
- Interaction energy, the contribution to the total energy that is a result of interaction between the objects being considered
- Internal energy (abbreviated E or U), the total kinetic energy due to the motion of molecules (translational, rotational, vibrational) and the total potential energy associated with the vibrational and electric energy of atoms within molecules.
- Negative energy
- Energy conversion, process of converting energy from one form to another
- Dark energy, used to explain some cosmological phenomena
- Energy quality, empirical experience of the characteristics of different energy forms as they flow and transform
- Energy density, amount of energy stored in a given system or region of space per unit volume, or per unit mass
- Energy flow, flow of energy in an ecosystem through food chains
- Energetics (disambiguation), the scientific study of energy in general
- Stress–energy tensor, the density and flux of energy and momentum in space-time; the source of the gravitational field in general relativity
- Food energy, energy in food that is available
- Primary energy, energy contained in raw fuels and any other forms of energy received by a system as input to the system.
- Radiant energy, energy that is transported by waves
- Rotational energy, part of an object's total kinetic energy due to its rotation
- Solar radiation, radiant energy emitted by the sun, particularly electromagnetic energy
- Tidal power, also called tidal energy, is a form of hydropower that converts the energy of tides into useful forms of power – mainly electricity, dynamic tidal power, tidal lagoons, tidal barrages
- Wave power is the transport of energy by ocean surface waves, and the capture of that energy to do useful work — for example, electricity generation, water desalination, or the pumping of water (into reservoirs). Machinery able to exploit wave power is generally known as a wave energy converter (WEC).
- Wind energy is the kinetic energy of air in motion; Wind power is the conversion of wind energy into a useful form of energy, such as using wind turbines to make electricity, windmills for mechanical power, windpumps for water pumping or drainage, or sails to propel ships

=== Allegorical and esoteric ===
- Energeticism, theory that there is no matter and everything is composed of energy
- Energy (esotericism), invoked by spiritualists for alternative modes of healing the human body as well as a spirit that permeates all of reality.
- Orgone, Wilhelm Reich discovered this energy and tried to use it to cure various physical ailments and control the weather.
- Bioenergetic analysis, body-oriented Reichian psychotherapy
- Qi, a concept from Oriental medicine that is sometimes translated as "energy" in the West.
- Vitalism, often referred to as "energy"
- Cold fusion, nuclear fusion at conditions close to room temperature.
- Bubble fusion, also known as Sonofusion, energy from acoustic collapse of bubbles.
- Water-fuelled car, powering a car using water as fuel.

== Politics ==
=== Energy issues ===
- 2000 Watt society
- Energy democracy
- Environmental concerns with electricity generation
- Fuel poverty
- Greasestock, American showcase of vehicles and technologies powered by alternative energy
- Low-carbon economy
- Peak Oil
- Soft energy path – an energy use and development strategy delineated and promoted by some energy experts and activists
- Strategic Petroleum Reserve (disambiguation)

=== Energy policies and use – national and international ===
==== International ====
- Energy policy – an introductory article
- Energy and Environmental Security Initiative

==== Regional and national ====
- Energy law – overview of many energy laws from various countries and states
  - New York energy law
- Energy Tax Act – United States energy-related legislation. See also : Category:United States federal energy legislation
- United Kingdom:
  - Energy policy of the United Kingdom
  - Energy use and conservation in the United Kingdom

== Economics ==
Energy economics

=== Energy companies ===
- ExxonMobil
- Enercon – Company based in Germany that operates in the wind turbine industry. One of the biggest producers in the world.
- Saudi Aramco
- Sasol
- United States Enrichment Corporation – contracts with the United States Department of Energy to produce enriched uranium.

=== Non-profit organizations ===
- Musicians United for Safe Energy

=== Industry associations ===
- OPEC – Organization of Petroleum-exporting Countries
- IEA – International Energy Agency
- CAPP – Canadian Association of Petroleum Producers
- World LP Gas Association – WLPGA

== Innovators ==
- Alessandro Volta
- Charles Kettering
- Farrington Daniels – solar energy
- Georges Leclanché – battery
- John Frederic Daniell – Daniell cell
- Rudolf Diesel – compression ignition internal combustion engine
- Georges Imbert – wood gas
- Leonardo da Vinci
- Moritz von Jacobi
- Nicolaus Otto – internal combustion engine
- Robert Stirling – Stirling engine (external combustion)
- Nikola Tesla
- James Watt – steam engine with separate condensor

== Lists ==
- List of books about energy issues
- List of energy abbreviations
- List of energy storage projects
- List of large wind farms
- List of notable renewable energy organizations
- List of photovoltaics companies
- List of renewable energy topics by country
- List of solar thermal power stations
- Index of wave articles
- List of wind turbine manufacturers

== See also ==
- Energy (disambiguation)
- List of environment topics
