= History of energy =

History of the physical concept

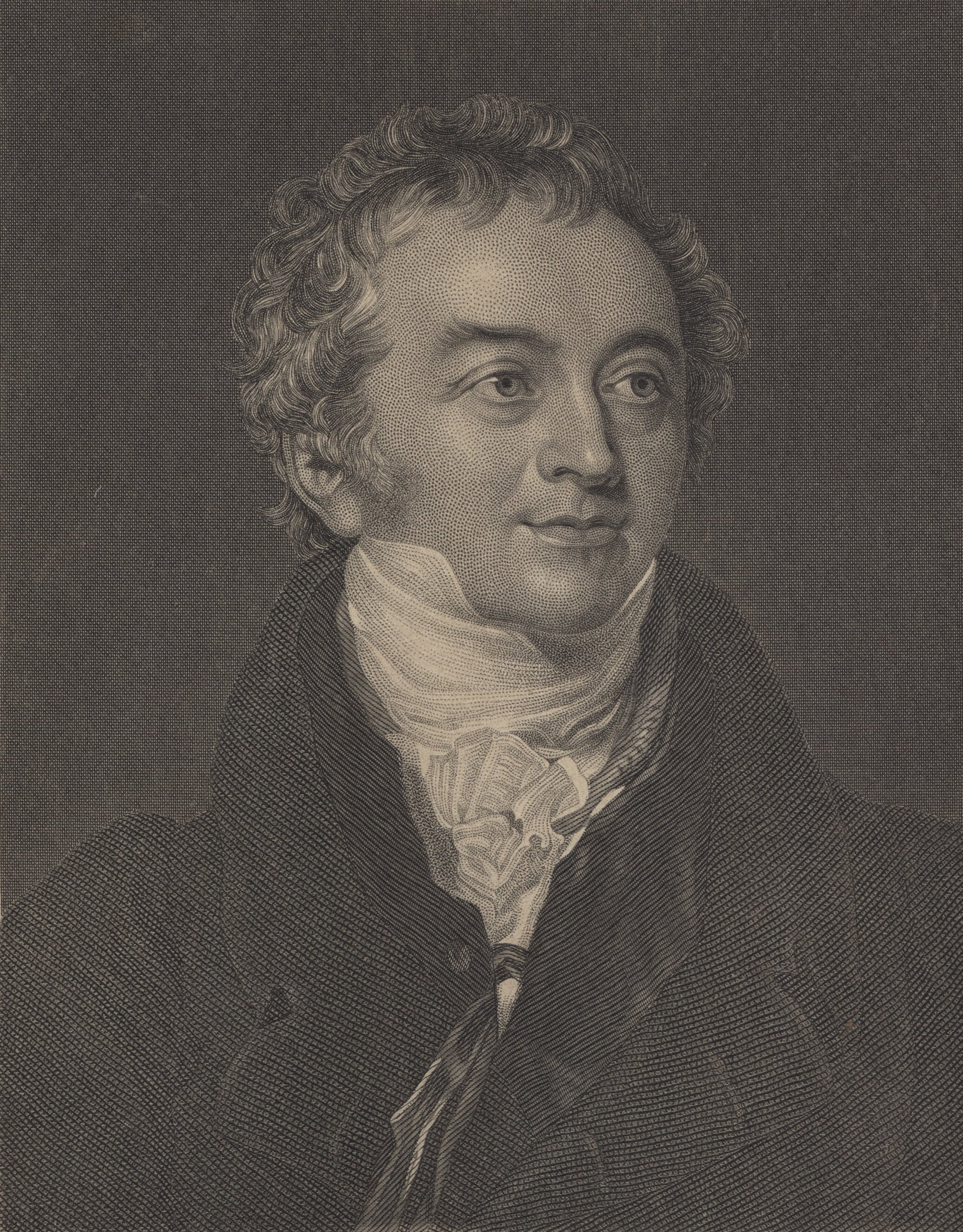
Thomas Young - the first to use the term "energy" to refer to kinetic energy in its modern sense, in 1802.

In the history of physics, the history of energy examines the gradual development of energy as a central scientific concept. Classical mechanics was initially understood through the study of motion and force by thinkers like Galileo Galilei and Isaac Newton, the importance of the concept of energy was made clear in the 19th century with the principles of thermodynamics, particularly the conservation of energy which established that energy cannot be created or destroyed, only transformed. In the 20th century Albert Einstein's mass–energy equivalence expanded this understanding by linking mass and energy, and quantum mechanics introduced quantized energy levels. Today, energy is recognized as a fundamental conserved quantity across all domains of physics, underlying both classical and quantum phenomena.

== Antiquity ==
The word energy derives from Greek word "energeia" (Greek: ἐνέργεια) meaning actuality, which appears for the first time in the 4th century BCE in various works of Aristotle when discussing potentiality and actuality including Physics, Metaphysics, Nicomachean Ethics and On the Soul.

== Kinetic energy ==
The modern concept of kinetic energy emerged from the idea of vis viva (living force), which Gottfried Wilhelm Leibniz defined over the period 1676–1689 as the product of the mass of an object and its velocity squared ($mv^2$); he believed that total vis viva was conserved. To account for slowing due to friction, Leibniz claimed that heat consisted of the random motion of the constituent parts of matter — a view described by Francis Bacon in Novum Organon to illustrate inductive reasoning and shared by Isaac Newton, although it would be more than a century until this was generally accepted.

Émilie du Châtelet in her book Institutions de Physique ("Lessons in Physics"), published in 1740, incorporated the idea of Leibniz with practical observations of Willem 's Gravesande to show that the "quantity of motion" of a moving object is proportional to its mass and its velocity squared (not the velocity itself as Newton taught—what was later called momentum).

Daniel Bernoulli extended the vis viva principle into the Bernoulli's principle for fluids in his book in his work Hydrodynamica of 1738.

In 1802 lectures to the Royal Society, Thomas Young was the first to use the term energy to refer to kinetic energy in its modern sense, instead of vis viva. In the 1807 publication of those lectures, he wrote,

The product of the mass of a body into the square of its velocity may properly be termed its energy.

In early 19th century, Jean-Victor Poncelet and his disciple Gustave-Gaspard Coriolis tried to give a quantitative description of energy related terms. Coriolis introduced the concept of work in 1829. In the same work he added the factor of 1/2 to vis viva to for mathematical consistency in 1829, defining kinetic energy in its modern sense. This work was generalized and popularized by Poncelet.

== Thermodynamics ==
It was argued for some years whether energy was a substance (the caloric) or merely a physical quantity.

The development of steam engines in the 18th century required engineers to develop concepts and formulas that would allow them to describe the mechanical and thermal efficiencies of their systems. Engineers such as Sadi Carnot, physicists such as James Prescott Joule, mathematicians such as Émile Clapeyron and Hermann von Helmholtz, and amateurs such as Julius Robert von Mayer all contributed to the notion that the ability to perform certain tasks, called work, was somehow related to the amount of energy in the system. In the 1850s, Glasgow professor of natural philosophy William Thomson and his ally in the engineering science William Rankine began to replace the older language of mechanics with terms such as actual energy, kinetic energy, and potential energy. In 1853, Rankine coined the term "potential energy."

William Thomson (Lord Kelvin) amalgamated all of these laws into the laws of thermodynamics, which aided in the rapid development of explanations of chemical processes using the concept of energy by Rudolf Clausius, Josiah Willard Gibbs and Walther Nernst. It also led to a mathematical formulation of the concept of entropy by Clausius, and to the introduction of laws of radiant energy by Jožef Stefan. Rankine coined the term potential energy. In 1881, William Thomson stated before an audience that:

The very name energy, though first used in its present sense by Dr Thomas Young about the beginning of this century, has only come into use practically after the doctrine which defines it had ... been raised from mere formula of mathematical dynamics to the position it now holds of a principle pervading all nature and guiding the investigator in the field of science.

Over the following thirty years or so this newly developing science went by various names, such as the dynamical theory of heat or energetics, but after the 1920s generally came to be known as thermodynamics, the science of energy transformations.

== Energy-mass equivalence ==
By the late 19th and early 20th century, physicists increasingly tried to explain inertia and mass in terms of electromagnetic fields, leading to the concept of electromagnetic mass, where the inertia of charged particles was attributed to their electromagnetic energy. In 1900, Henri Poincaré introduced the idea that electromagnetic radiation carries momentum and suggested a direct proportionality between electromagnetic energy and an equivalent mass. In 1904, Friedrich Hasenöhrl extended this to cavity radiation, finding that energy contributes an “apparent mass,” though with unresolved inconsistencies such as a factor numerical prefactor of 4/3.

These approaches still treated the relationship as specific to electromagnetism and relied on the assumption of an luminiferous aether. Albert Einstein’s 1905 analysis in special relativity removed this restriction by showing that when a body emits or absorbs energy, its mass changes, establishing a mass–energy equivalence independent of electromagnetic mechanisms. This led to the general principle $E=mc^2$.

== Time-translation symmetry ==
In 1918 Emmy Noether proved that the law of conservation of energy is the direct mathematical consequence of the time-translation symmetry. That is according to Noether's theorem relating symmetries and conserved quantity, energy is conserved because the laws of physics do not distinguish between different moments of time.

During a 1961 lecture for undergraduate students at the California Institute of Technology, Richard Feynman, a celebrated physics teacher and Nobel Laureate, said this about the concept of energy:

There is a fact, or if you wish, a law, governing natural phenomena that are known to date. There is no known exception to this law—it is exact so far we know. The law is called conservation of energy; it states that there is a certain quantity, which we call energy that does not change in manifold changes which nature undergoes. That is a most abstract idea, because it is a mathematical principle; it says that there is a numerical quantity, which does not change when something happens. It is not a description of a mechanism, or anything concrete; it is just a strange fact that we can calculate some number, and when we finish watching nature go through her tricks and calculate the number again, it is the same.

— The Feynman Lectures on Physics

== See also ==
- Timeline of thermodynamics
- History of physics
- History of the conservation of energy principle
- History of thermodynamics
- A Guide to the Scientific Knowledge of Things Familiar, a book by Ebenezer Cobham Brewer, published around 1840, presenting explanations for common phenomena
- Caloric theory
