= Reflections on the Motive Power of Fire =

Thermodynamics book by Sadi Carnot (1824)

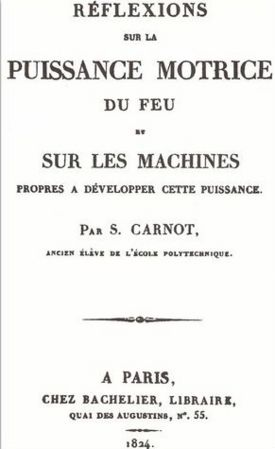
- Title page of the 1824 French first edition
- Author: Sadi Carnot
- Original title: Réflexions sur la puissance motrice du feu et sur les machines propres à développer cette puissance
- Language: French
- Subject: Thermodynamics
- Publisher: Bachelier
- Publication date: 1824
- Publication place: Paris, France
- Original text: Réflexions sur la puissance motrice du feu et sur les machines propres à développer cette puissance at French Wikisource
- Translation: Reflections on the Motive Power of Fire at Wikisource

Reflections on the Motive Power of Fire and on Machines Fitted to Develop that Power (French: Réflexions sur la puissance motrice du feu et sur les machines propres à développer cette puissance) is a scientific treatise written by the French military engineer Sadi Carnot. Published in 1824 in French, the short book (118 pages in the original) sought to advance a rational theory of heat engines. At the time, heat engines had acquired great technological and economic importance, but very little was understood about them from the point of view of physics.

Carnot's Reflections is now widely regarded as a key document in the development of modern thermodynamics, and Carnot himself (who published nothing else during his lifetime) has often been identified as the "father of thermodynamics". The book introduced such concepts as thermodynamic efficiency, reversible processes, the thermodynamic cycle, and Carnot's theorem.

== Overview ==
The book is considered the founding work of thermodynamics. It contains the preliminary outline of the second law of thermodynamics. Carnot stated that motive power is due to the fall of caloric (chute de calorique) from a hot to a cold body, which he analogized to the work done by a water wheel due to a waterfall (chute d'eau).

Despite the fact that the caloric theory of heat was incorrect, Carnot's work brought together three insights that remain relevant and were used by his successors to develop the concept of entropy:

- The "fall of heat" from a high temperature to a lower temperature is where the work comes from.
- Analyzing a cycle, rather than an open system, is the correct way to analyze a heat engine.
- The concept of a reversible process.

Similar to how the Reflections was the precursor to the second law, English physicist James Joule's 1843 paper Mechanical equivalent of heat was the precursor to the first law of thermodynamics. In his essay, Carnot also derived the result that later came to be known as the Clausius-Clapeyron relation.

== Influence ==
Carnot's essay received very little attention during Carnot's lifetime. Carnot published nothing else and died in 1832, at the age of 36. However, in 1834 a French mining engineer, Émile Clapeyron, published a Memoir on the Motive Power of Heat that presented Carnot's analysis graphically.

The German physicist Rudolf Clausius learned of Carnot's work through Clapeyron's memoir. Clausius corrected Carnot's theory by replacing the conservation of caloric with the work-heat equivalence (i.e., energy conservation). Clausius also put the second law of thermodynamics into mathematical form by defining the concept of entropy. That work appeared in 1850 in Clausius's Mechanical Theory of Heat.

Another highly influential commentary on Carnot's essay (also through Clapeyron's memoir) was published in 1849 by William Thomson (the future Lord Kelvin), in a paper titled An Account of Carnot's Theory of the Motive Power of Heat. In that paper, Kelvin said of Carnot's derivation of what would later be called the "Clausius-Clapeyron equation" that "nothing in the whole range of Natural Philosophy is more remarkable than the establishment of general laws by such a process of reasoning."

Because of their respective commentary's on Carnot's essay, modern textbooks on thermodynamics usually introduce a "Clausius statement" and a "Kelvin statement" of the second law of thermodynamics. These statements appear to be different, but they can be shown to be logically equivalent, by an argument based on the Carnot cycle.

== See also ==
- Timeline of thermodynamics
