= Energy economics (disambiguation) =

Energy economics is a broad scientific subject area which includes topics related to supply and use of energy in societies.

Energy economics may also refer to:

- Energy Economics (journal), an academic journal published by Elsevier
- Energetics (disambiguation), the study of energy under transformation
