= Enteromius condei =

Conservation status
- Data Deficient (IUCN 3.1)

Scientific classification
- Kingdom: Animalia
- Phylum: Chordata
- Class: Actinopterygii
- Order: Cypriniformes
- Family: Cyprinidae
- Subfamily: Smiliogastrinae
- Genus: Enteromius
- Species: E. condei

Binomial name
- Enteromius condei (Mahnert & Géry, 1982)

Synonyms
- Barbus condei Mahnert & Géry, 1982

Species of fish

Enteromius condei is a species of ray-finned fish in the genus Enteromius, endemic to Gabon.

== Etymology ==
The fish is named in honor of zoologist Bruno Condé (1920-2004), the director of Aquarium Museum of Nancy, who helped collect the type specimen.
