= Timeline of thermodynamics =

A timeline of events in the history of thermodynamics.

== Before 1800 ==
- 1593 – Galileo Galilei invents one of the first thermoscopes, also known as Galileo thermometer
- 1650 – Otto von Guericke builds the first vacuum pump
- 1660 – Robert Boyle experimentally discovers Boyle's law, relating the pressure and volume of a gas (published 1662)
- 1665 – Robert Hooke published his book Micrographia, which contained the statement: "Heat being nothing else but a very brisk and vehement agitation of the parts of a body."
- 1667 – J. J. Becher puts forward a theory of combustion involving combustible earth in his book Physica subterranea (see Phlogiston theory).
- 1676–1689 – Gottfried Leibniz develops the concept of vis viva, a limited version of the conservation of energy
- 1679 – Denis Papin designed a steam digester which inspired the development of the piston-and-cylinder steam engine.
- 1694–1734 – Georg Ernst Stahl names Becher's combustible earth as phlogiston and develops the theory
- 1698 – Thomas Savery patents an early steam engine
- 1702 – Guillaume Amontons introduces the concept of absolute zero, based on observations of gases
- 1738 – Daniel Bernoulli publishes Hydrodynamica, initiating the kinetic theory
- 1749 – Émilie du Châtelet, in her French translation and commentary on Newton's Philosophiae Naturalis Principia Mathematica, derives the conservation of energy from the first principles of Newtonian mechanics.
- 1761 – Joseph Black discovers that ice absorbs heat without changing its temperature when melting
- 1772 – Black's student Daniel Rutherford discovers nitrogen, which he calls phlogisticated air, and together they explain the results in terms of the phlogiston theory
- 1776 – John Smeaton publishes a paper on experiments related to power, work, momentum, and kinetic energy, supporting the conservation of energy
- 1777 – Carl Wilhelm Scheele distinguishes heat transfer by thermal radiation from that by convection and conduction
- 1783 – Antoine Lavoisier discovers oxygen and develops an explanation for combustion; in his paper "Réflexions sur le phlogistique", he deprecates the phlogiston theory and proposes a caloric theory
- 1784 – Jan Ingenhousz describes Brownian motion of charcoal particles on water
- 1791 – Pierre Prévost shows that all bodies radiate heat, no matter how hot or cold they are
- 1798 – Count Rumford (Benjamin Thompson) publishes his paper "An Inquiry Concerning the Source of the Heat Which Is Excited by Friction" detailing measurements of the frictional heat generated in boring cannons and develops the idea that heat is a form of kinetic energy; his measurements are inconsistent with caloric theory, but are also sufficiently imprecise as to leave room for doubt.

== 1800–1847 ==
- 1802 – Joseph Louis Gay-Lussac publishes Charles's law, discovered (but unpublished) by Jacques Charles around 1787; this shows the dependency between temperature and volume. Gay-Lussac also formulates the law relating temperature with pressure (the pressure law, or Gay-Lussac's law)
- 1804 – Sir John Leslie observes that a matte black surface radiates heat more effectively than a polished surface, suggesting the importance of black-body radiation
- 1805 – William Hyde Wollaston defends the conservation of energy in On the Force of Percussion
- 1808 – John Dalton defends caloric theory in A New System of Chemistry and describes how it combines with matter, especially gases; he proposes that the heat capacity of gases varies inversely with atomic weight
- 1810 – Sir John Leslie freezes water to ice artificially
- 1813 – Peter Ewart supports the idea of the conservation of energy in his paper On the measure of moving force; the paper strongly influences Dalton and his pupil, James Joule
- 1819 – Pierre Louis Dulong and Alexis Thérèse Petit give the Dulong-Petit law for the specific heat capacity of a crystal
- 1820 – John Herapath develops some ideas in the kinetic theory of gases but mistakenly associates temperature with molecular momentum rather than kinetic energy; his work receives little attention other than from Joule
- 1822 – Joseph Fourier formally introduces the use of dimensions for physical quantities in his Théorie Analytique de la Chaleur
- 1822 – Marc Seguin writes to John Herschel supporting the conservation of energy and kinetic theory
- 1824 – Sadi Carnot analyzes the efficiency of steam engines using caloric theory; he develops the notion of a reversible process and, in postulating that no such thing exists in nature, lays the foundation for the second law of thermodynamics, and initiating the science of thermodynamics
- 1827 – Robert Brown discovers the Brownian motion of pollen and dye particles in water
- 1831 – Macedonio Melloni demonstrates that black-body radiation can be reflected, refracted, and polarised in the same way as light
- 1834 – Émile Clapeyron popularises Carnot's work through a graphical and analytic formulation. He also combined Boyle's law, Charles's law, and Gay-Lussac's law to produce a combined gas law. PV/T = k
- 1841 – Julius Robert von Mayer, an amateur scientist, writes a paper on the conservation of energy, but his lack of academic training leads to its rejection
- 1842 – Mayer makes a connection between work, heat, and the human metabolism based on his observations of blood made while a ship's surgeon; he calculates the mechanical equivalent of heat
- 1842 – William Robert Grove demonstrates the thermal dissociation of molecules into their constituent atoms, by showing that steam can be disassociated into oxygen and hydrogen, and the process reversed
- 1843 – John James Waterston fully expounds the kinetic theory of gases, but according to D Levermore "there is no evidence that any physical scientist read the book; perhaps it was overlooked because of its misleading title, Thoughts on the Mental Functions."
- 1843 – James Joule experimentally finds the mechanical equivalent of heat
- 1845 – Henri Victor Regnault added Avogadro's law to the combined gas law to produce the ideal gas law. PV = nRT
- 1846 – Grove publishes an account of the general theory of the conservation of energy in On The Correlation of Physical Forces
- 1847 – Hermann von Helmholtz publishes a definitive statement of the conservation of energy, the first law of thermodynamics

== 1848–1899 ==
- 1848 – William Thomson extends the concept of absolute zero from gases to all substances
- 1849 – William John Macquorn Rankine calculates the correct relationship between saturated vapour pressure and temperature using his hypothesis of molecular vortices
- 1850 – Rankine uses his vortex theory to establish accurate relationships between the temperature, pressure, and density of gases, and expressions for the latent heat of evaporation of a liquid; he accurately predicts the surprising fact that the apparent specific heat of saturated steam will be negative
- 1850 – Rudolf Clausius coined the term "entropy" (das Wärmegewicht, symbolized S) to denote heat lost or turned into waste. ("Wärmegewicht" translates literally as "heat-weight"; the corresponding English term stems from the Greek τρέπω, "I turn".)
- 1850 – Clausius gives the first clear joint statement of the first and second law of thermodynamics, abandoning the caloric theory, but preserving Carnot's principle
- 1851 – Thomson gives an alternative statement of the second law
- 1852 – Joule and Thomson demonstrate that a rapidly expanding gas cools, later named the Joule–Thomson effect or Joule–Kelvin effect
- 1854 – Helmholtz puts forward the idea of the heat death of the universe
- 1854 – Clausius establishes the importance of dQ/T (Clausius's theorem), but does not yet name the quantity
- 1854 – Rankine introduces his thermodynamic function, later identified as entropy
- 1856 – August Krönig publishes an account of the kinetic theory of gases, probably after reading Waterston's work
- 1857 – Clausius gives a modern and compelling account of the kinetic theory of gases in his On the nature of motion called heat
- 1859 – James Clerk Maxwell discovers the distribution law of molecular velocities
- 1859 – Gustav Kirchhoff shows that energy emission from a black body is a function of only temperature and frequency
- 1862 – "Disgregation", a precursor of entropy, was defined in 1862 by Clausius as the magnitude of the degree of separation of molecules of a body
- 1865 – Clausius introduces the modern macroscopic concept of entropy
- 1865 – Josef Loschmidt applies Maxwell's theory to estimate the number-density of molecules in gases, given observed gas viscosities.
- 1867 – Maxwell asks whether Maxwell's demon could reverse irreversible processes
- 1870 – Clausius proves the scalar virial theorem
- 1872 – Ludwig Boltzmann states the Boltzmann equation for the temporal development of distribution functions in phase space, and publishes his H-theorem
- 1873 - Johannes Diderik van der Waals formulates his equation of state
- 1874 – Thomson formally states the second law of thermodynamics
- 1876 – Josiah Willard Gibbs publishes the first of two papers (the second appears in 1878) which discuss phase equilibria, statistical ensembles, the free energy as the driving force behind chemical reactions, and chemical thermodynamics in general.
- 1876 – Loschmidt criticises Boltzmann's H theorem as being incompatible with microscopic reversibility (Loschmidt's paradox).
- 1877 – Boltzmann states the relationship between entropy and probability
- 1879 – Jožef Stefan observes that the total radiant flux from a blackbody is proportional to the fourth power of its temperature and states the Stefan–Boltzmann law
- 1884 – Boltzmann derives the Stefan–Boltzmann blackbody radiant flux law from thermodynamic considerations
- 1888 – Henri-Louis Le Chatelier states his principle that the response of a chemical system perturbed from equilibrium will be to counteract the perturbation
- 1889 – Walther Nernst relates the voltage of electrochemical cells to their chemical thermodynamics via the Nernst equation
- 1889 – Svante Arrhenius introduces the idea of activation energy for chemical reactions, giving the Arrhenius equation
- 1893 – Wilhelm Wien discovers the displacement law for a blackbody's maximum specific intensity

== 1900–1944 ==
- 1900 – Max Planck suggests that light may be emitted in discrete frequencies, giving his law of black-body radiation
- 1905 – Albert Einstein, in the first of his miracle year papers, argues that the reality of quanta would explain the photoelectric effect
- 1905 – Einstein mathematically analyzes Brownian motion as a result of random molecular motion in his paper On the movement of small particles suspended in a stationary liquid demanded by the molecular-kinetic theory of heat
- 1906 – Nernst presents a formulation of the third law of thermodynamics
- 1907 – Einstein uses quantum theory to estimate the heat capacity of an Einstein solid
- 1909 – Constantin Carathéodory develops an axiomatic system of thermodynamics
- 1910 – Einstein and Marian Smoluchowski find the Einstein–Smoluchowski formula for the attenuation coefficient due to density fluctuations in a gas
- 1911 – Paul Ehrenfest and Tatjana Ehrenfest–Afanassjewa publish their classical review on the statistical mechanics of Boltzmann, Begriffliche Grundlagen der statistischen Auffassung in der Mechanik
- 1912 – Peter Debye gives an improved heat capacity estimate by allowing low-frequency phonons
- 1916 – Sydney Chapman and David Enskog systematically develop the kinetic theory of gases
- 1916 – Einstein considers the thermodynamics of atomic spectral lines and predicts stimulated emission
- 1919 – James Jeans discovers that the dynamical constants of motion determine the distribution function for a system of particles
- 1920 – Meghnad Saha states his ionization equation
- 1923 – Debye and Erich Hückel publish a statistical treatment of the dissociation of electrolytes
- 1924 – Satyendra Nath Bose introduces Bose–Einstein statistics, in a paper translated by Einstein
- 1926 – Enrico Fermi and Paul Dirac introduce Fermi–Dirac statistics
- 1927 – John von Neumann introduces the density matrix representation, establishing quantum statistical mechanics
- 1928 – John B. Johnson discovers Johnson noise in a resistor
- 1928 – Harry Nyquist derives the fluctuation-dissipation theorem, a relationship to explain Johnson noise in a resistor
- 1931 – Lars Onsager publishes his groundbreaking paper deriving the Onsager reciprocal relations
- 1935 – Ralph H. Fowler invents the title 'the zeroth law of thermodynamics' to summarise postulates made by earlier physicists that thermal equilibrium between systems is a transitive relation
- 1938 – Anatoly Vlasov proposes the Vlasov equation for a correct dynamical description of ensembles of particles with collective long range interaction
- 1939 – Nikolay Krylov and Nikolay Bogolyubov give the first consistent microscopic derivation of the Fokker–Planck equation in the single scheme of classical and quantum mechanics
- 1942 – Joseph L. Doob states his theorem on Gauss–Markov processes
- 1944 – Lars Onsager gives an analytic solution to the 2-dimensional Ising model, including its phase transition

== 1945–present ==
- 1945–1946 – Nikolay Bogoliubov develops a general method for a microscopic derivation of kinetic equations for classical statistical systems using BBGKY hierarchy
- 1947 – Nikolay Bogoliubov and Kirill Gurov extend this method for a microscopic derivation of kinetic equations for quantum statistical systems
- 1948 – Claude Elwood Shannon establishes information theory
- 1957 – Aleksandr Solomonovich Kompaneets derives his Compton scattering Fokker–Planck equation
- 1957 – Ryogo Kubo derives the first of the Green-Kubo relations for linear transport coefficients
- 1957 – Edwin T. Jaynes publishes two papers detailing the MaxEnt interpretation of thermodynamics from information theory
- 1960–1965 – Dmitry Zubarev develops the method of non-equilibrium statistical operator, which becomes a classical tool in the statistical theory of non-equilibrium processes
- 1972 – Jacob Bekenstein suggests that black holes have an entropy proportional to their surface area
- 1974 – Stephen Hawking predicts that black holes will radiate particles with a black-body spectrum which can cause black hole evaporation
- 1977 – Ilya Prigogine wins the Nobel prize for his work on dissipative structures in thermodynamic systems far from equilibrium. The importation and dissipation of energy could reverse the 2nd law of thermodynamics

== See also ==
- Timeline of heat engine technology
- History of physics
- History of thermodynamics
- Thermodynamics
- Timeline of information theory
- List of textbooks in thermodynamics and statistical mechanics
