= Energetic (disambiguation) =

To be energetic is to possess, exert, or display the ability to do physical work.

Energetic may also refer to:

- "Energetic" (BoA song), a 2010 song by BoA
- "Energetic" (Wanna One song), a 2017 song by Wanna One
- Energetic mood, a linguistic term

== See also ==
- Energetics (disambiguation), relating to the study of energy under transformation
- Energized, a 1974 album by the group Foghat
