= Aquarium Museum, Nancy =

Aquarium in Nancy, France

- Muséum-aquarium de Nancy
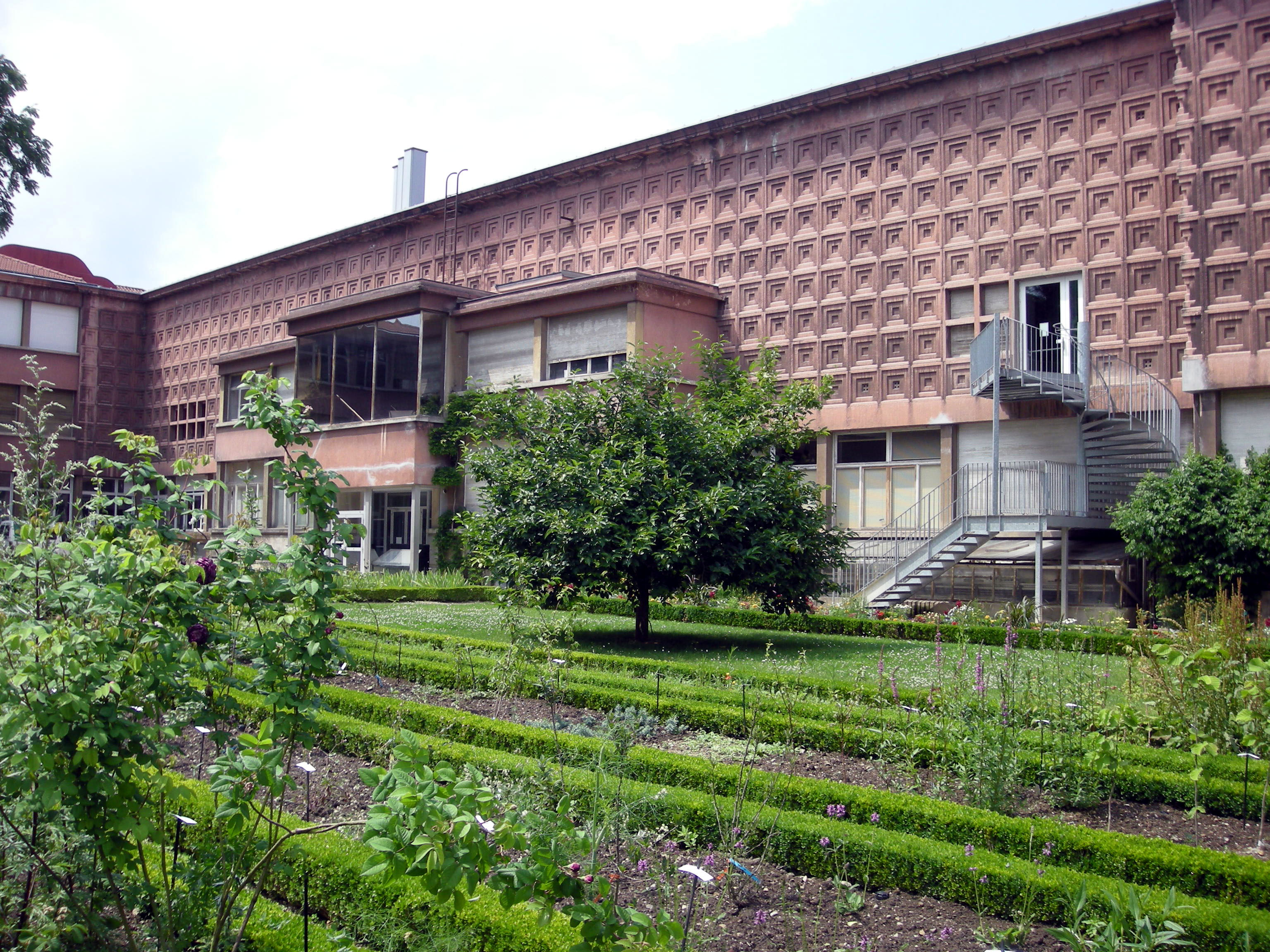
- Location: Nancy, France
- Coordinates: 48.6948°N 6.1881°E

The Aquarium Museum of Nancy (French: Muséum-aquarium de Nancy, MAN), is a heritage establishment of scientific and technical culture jointly managed by the Métropole du Grand Nancy and the University of Lorraine.

This natural history museum includes zoological and paleontological collections as well as living collections, mainly ichthyological.

The Aquarium Museum is made up of two storeys. On the ground floor, there are three aquariums, the Nautilus and Calypso galleries, as well as the boat room. At the end of the Nautilus gallery, the Astrolabe gallery hosts temporary exhibits of contemporary artists. The Cuénor amphitheatre is also on the ground floor. The zoology gallery as well as two other spaces for exhibits are on the first floor.

== Location ==
The Aquarium Museum, previously known as the Institute of Zoology (French: Institut de Zoologie) is located in the heart of Nancy, at 34, rue sainte catherine. The old botanical garden of Nancy, called the Dominique Alexandre Godron Garden (French: jardin Dominique Alexandre Godron) can be found behind the building of the Aquarium Museum.

The closest tramway station to the museum is the station "Division de fer" on line 1 of the Nancy tramway, located 300m from the museum. Free parking is available along the East Canal, and close to the Porte Sainte Catherine.

== Architecture ==
The building hosting the museum was built in 1933 and was designed by Jacques and Michel André. The building's architecture was notably inspired by the work of the American architect, Frank Lloyd Wright. As it is a necessary condition for the proper conservation of natural history collections, the building has a windowless façade. The building is classified as a historical monument, established in a decree from 6 December 2016.

== History ==
=== Origin ===
In 1752, Stanislas Leszczynski, Duke of Lorraine, created a Royal College of Medicine by bringing together former private regional collections. These first collections of Nancy's natural history cabinet, from which the Muséum-Aquarium was created, came from the assembly of seventeen cabinets of curiosities, often belonging to enlightened amateurs and made up of a variety of heterogeneous items such as antiquities, fossils, herbariums, naturalised animals and even old medals. In addition to its conservation activities, the college also offered courses in anatomy, botany and surgery. The collections, consisting of herbariums, minerals, fossils and representatives of various vertebrate taxa, were used for teaching purposes.

In 1798, the École Centrale de la Meurthe was created and moved, along with the natural history collections, to the building that currently hosts the Nancy municipal library. Six years later, in 1804, the Écoles Centrales were replaced by lycées, and natural science teaching was abandoned. The collections were then set aside, and preserved but stored in poor conditions.

The collections continued to grow and were managed by a number of curators who were renowned naturalists, including Pierre Remy Willemet, Émile Braconnot, Charles de Haldat du Lys, Soyer-Willemet and Dominique-Alexandre Godron. It was not until 1854, the year in which Nancy's Faculty of Science was created, that the natural history department was revived.

The University of Nancy was expanding rapidly and moved into the Palais de l'Université on Place Carnot in the early 1860s. The natural history collections, comprising mineralogy and geology from Lorraine, comparative anatomy, anthropology, zoology and herbariums, occupied three rooms and were regularly open to the general public.

=== New building ===
It is thanks to the action of Lucien Cuénot, director of the natural history cabinet in 1898, that the museum acquired its present form. Indeed, under his tenure, the museum's collections grew so much that it became necessary to move them. At the beginning of the 20th century, the natural history museum's collections were spread out over multiple sites in the city: geology, mineralogy, and palaeontology collections left the University Palace and were put in the old seminary, rue de Strasbourg. The botanical collections were installed near the botanical garden, 6 rue Sainte-Catherine, near the place Stanislas and the Porte Sainte Catherine.

=== 21st century ===
In 2004, the Muséum-Aquarium obtained the label Musée de France, a national designation that guarantees greater protection for the museum's collections, which are legally imprescriptible and inalienable.

A new zoology gallery was opened in 2005. Designed around Lucien Cuénot's family tree, the gallery presents the classification of living things. A selection of nearly 600 animals has been carefully restored and installed to showcase the world's zoological diversity.

In 2011 and 2012, the aquarium galleries will be modernized and some of the museum's heritage collections will be added to the aquarium gallery space to make the link between living and natural history more visible.

The Lucien Cuénot amphitheatre, created in 1933 and renovated in 2013, hosts a wide range of events, mainly related to scientific and technical culture. The access to the 210-seat amphitheatre is via rue Godron. It is accessible to people with reduced mobility as well as to hearing-impaired people fitted with a magnetic loop.

== Collections ==
=== Natural history collections ===
The natural history collections contain around 18,000 naturalised specimens out of a total of 140,000 specimens, 600 of which are currently on display. The collections contain a great variety of specimens: mammals, insects, ethnology collections, osteology, naturalized animals, and dry or fluid collections. Most of the specimens are very old, having been naturalized at the end of the 19th century.

=== Living collections ===
The Aquarium Museum has 57 publicly accessible aquariums.
