= History of thermodynamics =

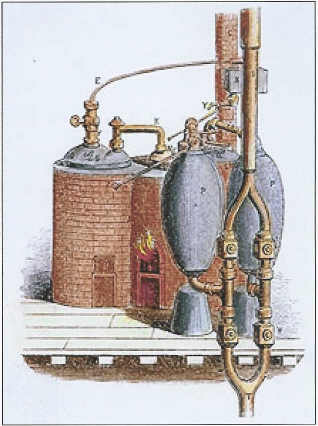
The 1698 Savery Engine – the world's first commercially important steam engine: built by Thomas Savery

The history of thermodynamics is a fundamental strand in the history of physics, the history of chemistry, and the history of science in general. Due to the relevance of thermodynamics in much of science and technology, its history is finely woven with the developments of classical mechanics, quantum mechanics, magnetism, and chemical kinetics, to more distant applied fields such as meteorology, information theory, and biology (physiology), and to technological developments such as the steam engine, internal combustion engine, cryogenics and electricity generation. The development of thermodynamics both drove and was driven by atomic theory. It also, albeit in a subtle manner, motivated new directions in probability and statistics; see, for example, the timeline of thermodynamics.

== Antiquity ==
The ancients viewed heat as that related to fire. In 3000 BC, the ancient Egyptians viewed heat as related to origin mythologies. The ancient Indian philosophy including Vedic philosophy believed that five classical elements (or pancha mahā bhūta) are the basis of all cosmic creations. In the Western philosophical tradition, after much debate about the primal element among earlier pre-Socratic philosophers, Empedocles proposed a four-element theory, in which all substances derive from earth, water, air, and fire. The Empedoclean element of fire is perhaps the principal ancestor of later concepts such as phlogiston and caloric. Around 500 BC, the Greek philosopher Heraclitus became famous as the "flux and fire" philosopher for his proverbial utterance: "All things are flowing." Heraclitus argued that the three principal elements in nature were fire, earth, and water.

=== Vacuum-abhorrence ===
The 5th century BC Greek philosopher Parmenides, in his only known work, a poem conventionally titled On Nature, uses verbal reasoning to postulate that a void, essentially what is now known as a vacuum, in nature could not occur. This view was supported by the arguments of Aristotle, but was criticized by Leucippus and Hero of Alexandria. From antiquity to the Middle Ages various arguments were put forward to prove or disapprove the existence of a vacuum and several attempts were made to construct a vacuum but all proved unsuccessful.

Heating a body, such as a segment of protein alpha helix (above), tends to cause its atoms to vibrate more, and the body itself to expand—or change phase, if heating is continued; an axiom of nature noted by Herman Boerhaave in the 1700s.

=== Atomism ===
Atomism is a central part of today's relationship between thermodynamics and statistical mechanics. Ancient thinkers such as Leucippus and Democritus, and later the Epicureans, by advancing atomism, laid the foundations for the later atomic theory. Until experimental proof of atoms was later provided in the 20th century, the atomic theory was driven largely by philosophical considerations and scientific intuition.

== 17th century ==
=== Early thermometers ===
The European scientists Cornelius Drebbel, Robert Fludd, Galileo Galilei and Santorio Santorio in the 16th and 17th centuries were able to gauge the relative "coldness" or "hotness" of air, using a rudimentary air thermometer (or thermoscope). This may have been influenced by an earlier device which could expand and contract the air constructed by Philo of Byzantium and Hero of Alexandria.

=== "Heat is motion" (Francis Bacon) ===
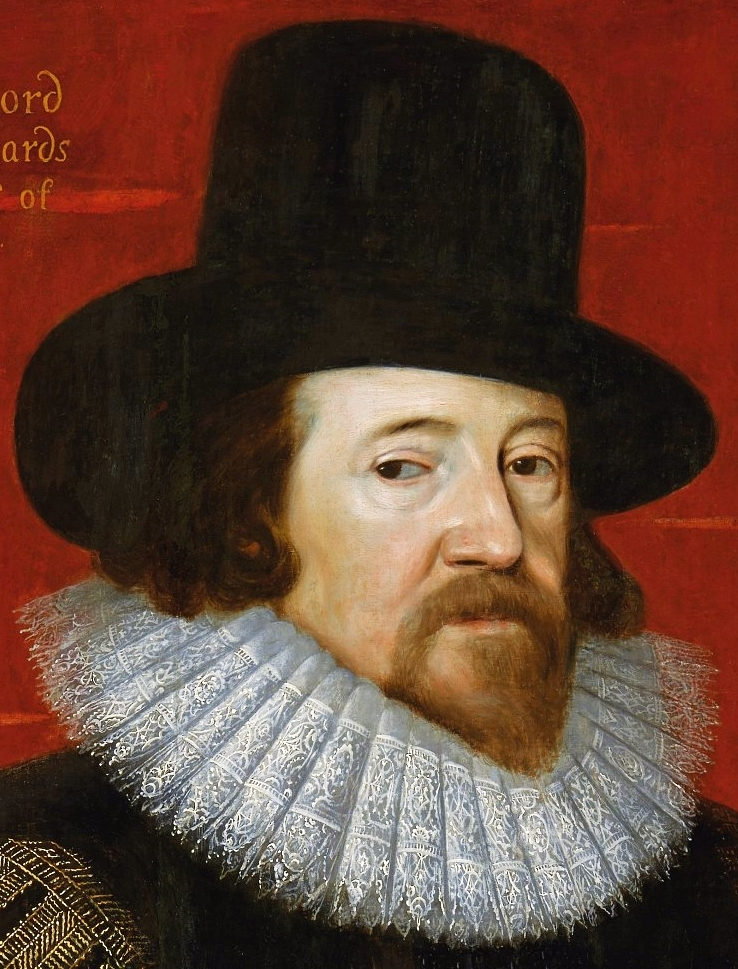
Francis Bacon

The idea that heat is a form of motion is perhaps an ancient one and is certainly discussed by the English philosopher and scientist Francis Bacon in 1620 in his Novum Organum. Bacon surmised: "Heat itself, its essence and quiddity is motion and nothing else." "not ... of the whole, but of the small particles of the body."

=== René Descartes ===
==== Precursor to work ====
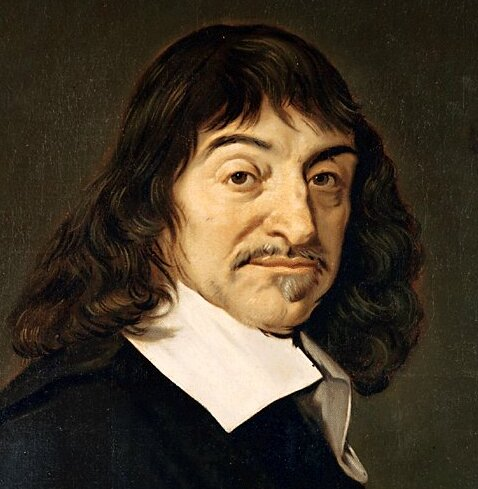
René Descartes

In 1637, in a letter to the Dutch scientist Christiaan Huygens, the French philosopher René Descartes wrote:

Lifting 100 lb one foot twice over is the same as lifting 200 lb one foot, or 100 lb two feet.

In 1686, the German philosopher Gottfried Leibniz wrote essentially the same thing: The same force ["work" in modern terms] is necessary to raise body A of 1 pound (libra) to a height of 4 yards (ulnae), as is necessary to raise body B of 4 pounds to a height of 1 yard.

==== Quantity of motion ====
In Principles of Philosophy (Principia Philosophiae) from 1644, Descartes defined "quantity of motion" (Latin: quantitas motus) as the product of size and speed, and claimed that the total quantity of motion in the universe is conserved.

If x is twice the size of y, and is moving half as fast, then there's the same amount of motion in each.

[God] created matter, along with its motion ... merely by letting things run their course, he preserves the same amount of motion ... as he put there in the beginning.

He claimed that merely by letting things run their course, God preserves the same amount of motion as He created, and that thus the total quantity of motion in the universe is conserved.

=== Boyle's law ===
Boyle's law

Irish physicist and chemist Robert Boyle in 1656, in coordination with English scientist Robert Hooke, built an air pump. Using this pump, Boyle and Hooke noticed the pressure-volume correlation: PV=constant. In that time, air was assumed to be a system of motionless particles, and not interpreted as a system of moving molecules. The concept of thermal motion came two centuries later. Therefore, Boyle's publication in 1660 speaks about a mechanical concept: the air spring. Later, after the invention of the thermometer, the property temperature could be quantified. This tool gave Gay-Lussac the opportunity to derive his law, which led shortly later to the ideal gas law.

==== Gas laws in brief ====
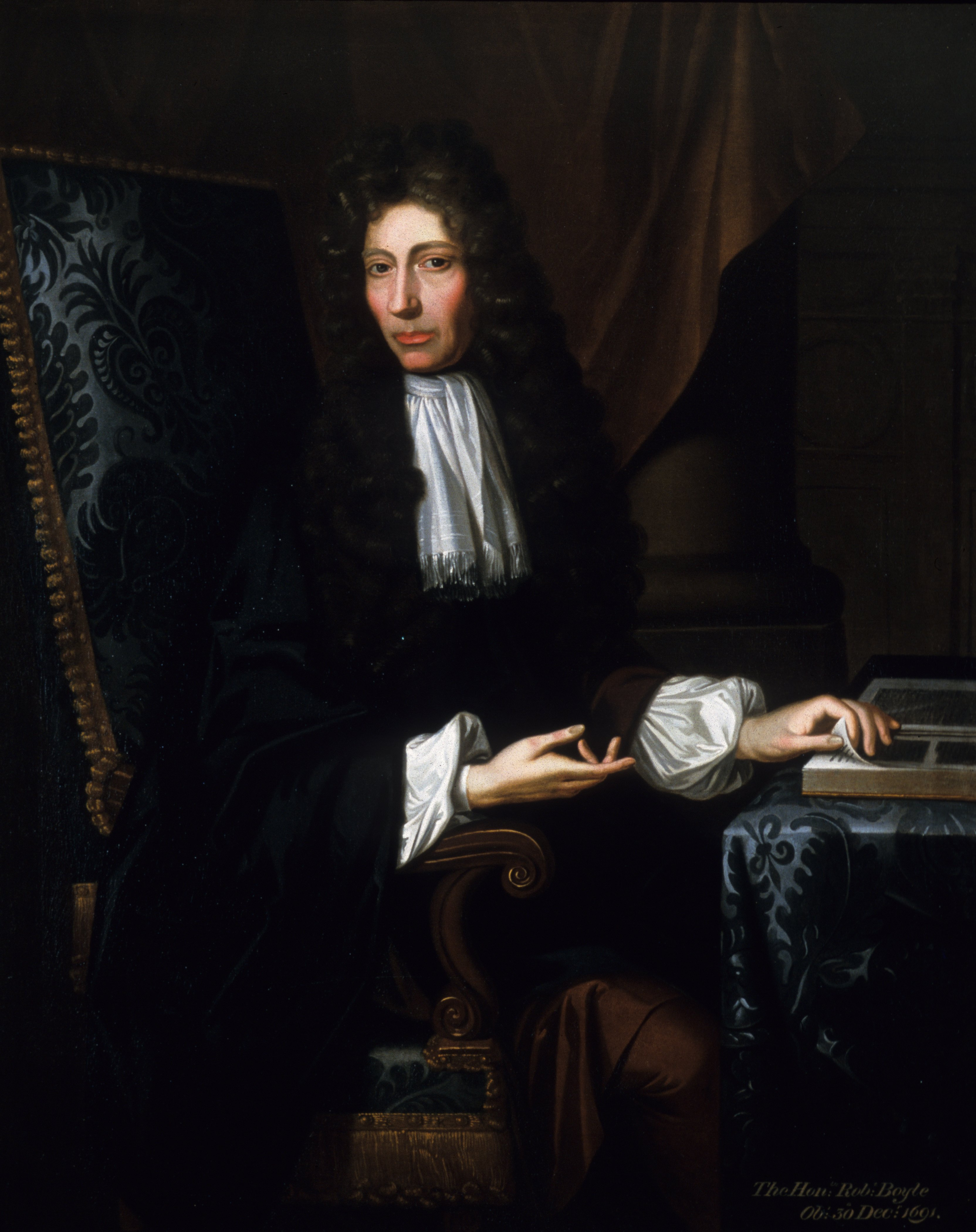
Robert Boyle. 1627–1691

- Boyle's law (1662)
- Charles's law was first published by Joseph Louis Gay-Lussac in 1802, but he referenced unpublished work by Jacques Charles from around 1787. The relationship had been anticipated by the work of Guillaume Amontons in 1702.
- Gay-Lussac's law (1802)

=== Steam digester ===
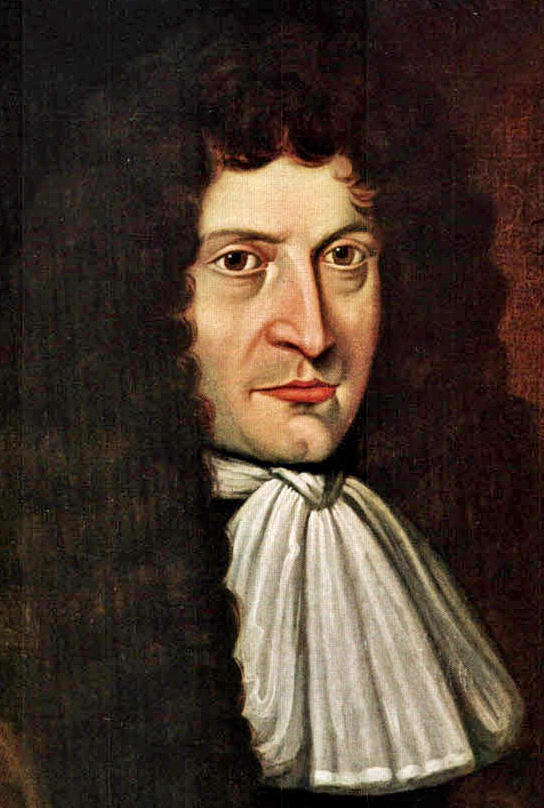
Denis Papin

Denis Papin, an associate of Boyle's, built in 1679 a bone digester, which is a closed vessel with a tightly fitting lid that confines steam until a high pressure is generated. Later designs implemented a steam release valve to keep the machine from exploding. By watching the valve rhythmically move up and down, Papin conceived of the idea of a piston and cylinder engine. He did not however follow through with his design. Nevertheless, in 1697, based on Papin's designs, Thomas Newcomen greatly improved upon engineer Thomas Savery's earlier "fire engine" by incorporating a piston. This made it suitable for mechanical work in addition to pumping to heights beyond 30 feet, and is thus often considered the first true steam engine.

=== Heat transfer (Halley and Newton) ===
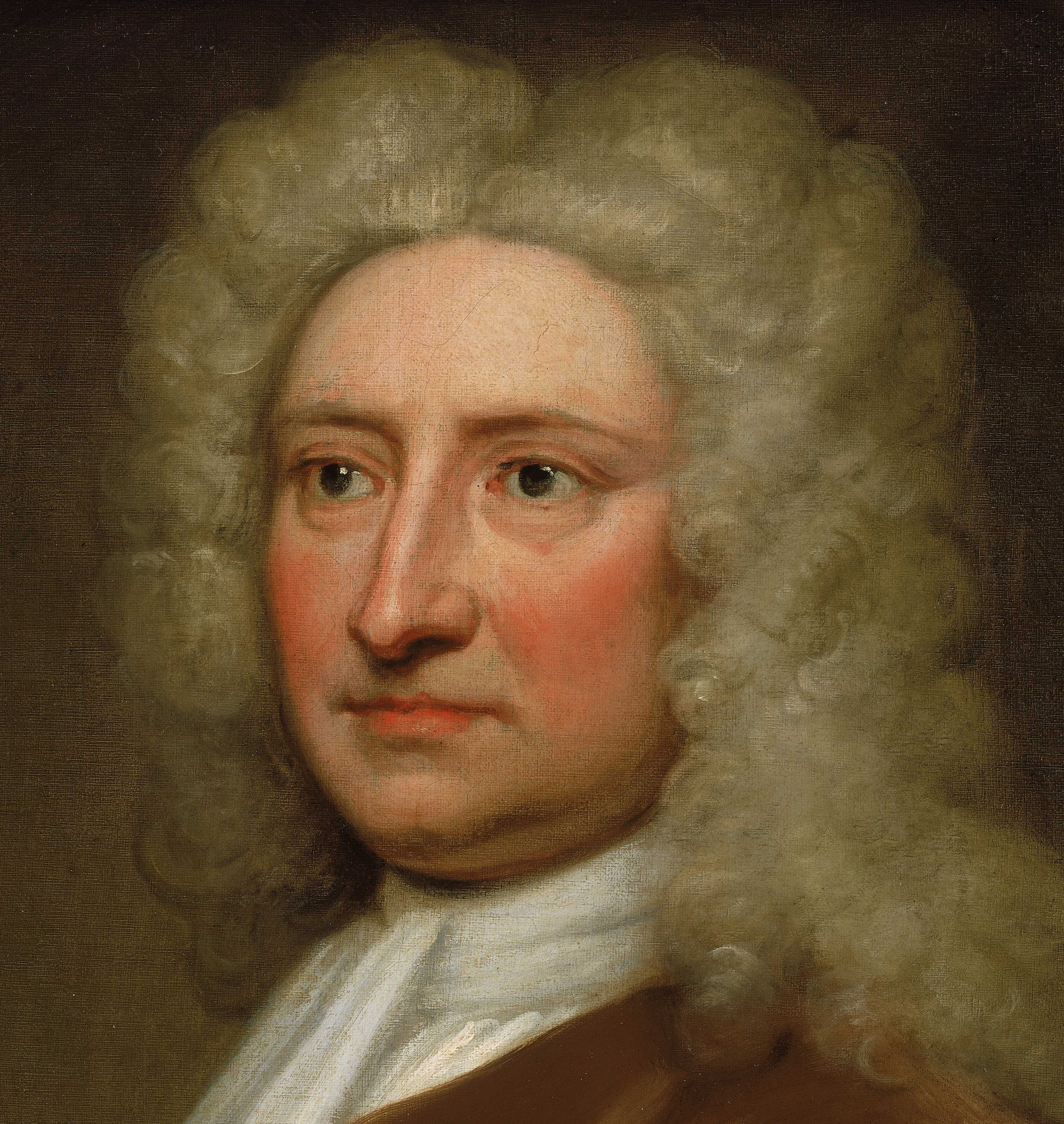
Edmond Halley

The phenomenon of heat conduction is immediately grasped in everyday life. The fact that warm air rises and the importance of the phenomenon to meteorology was first realised by Edmond Halley in 1686.

In 1701, Sir Isaac Newton published his law of cooling.

== 18th century ==
=== Phlogiston theory ===
The theory of phlogiston arose in the 17th century, late in the period of alchemy. Its replacement by caloric theory in the 18th century is one of the historical markers of the transition from alchemy to chemistry. Phlogiston was a hypothetical substance that was presumed to be liberated from combustible substances during burning, and from metals during the process of rusting.

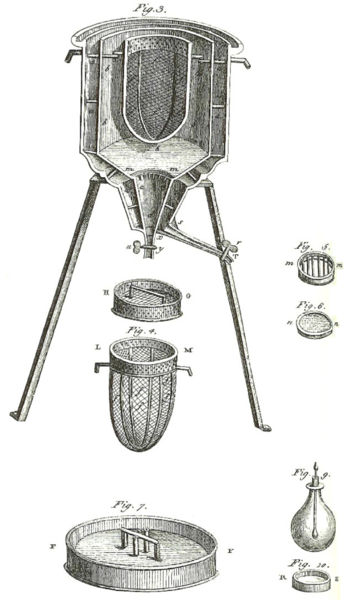
The world's first ice-calorimeter, used in the winter of 1782–83, by Antoine Lavoisier and Pierre-Simon Laplace, to determine the heat evolved in various chemical changes; calculations which were based on Joseph Black's prior discovery of latent heat. These experiments mark the foundation of thermochemistry.

=== Limit to the "degree of cold" ===
In 1702 Guillaume Amontons introduced the concept of absolute zero based on observations of gases.

=== Kinetic theory (18th century) ===
An early scientific reflection on the microscopic and kinetic nature of matter and heat is found in a work by Mikhail Lomonosov, in which he wrote: "Movement should not be denied based on the fact it is not seen. ... leaves of trees move when rustled by a wind, despite it being unobservable from large distances. Just as in this case motion ... remains hidden in warm bodies due to the extremely small sizes of the moving particles."

During the same years, Daniel Bernoulli published his book Hydrodynamics (1738), in which he derived an equation for the pressure of a gas considering the collisions of its atoms with the walls of a container. He proved that this pressure is two thirds the average kinetic energy of the gas in a unit volume. Bernoulli's ideas, however, made little impact on the dominant caloric culture. Bernoulli made a connection with Gottfried Leibniz's vis viva principle, an early formulation of the principle of conservation of energy, and the two theories became intimately entwined throughout their history.

=== Thermochemistry and steam engines ===
==== Heat capacity ====
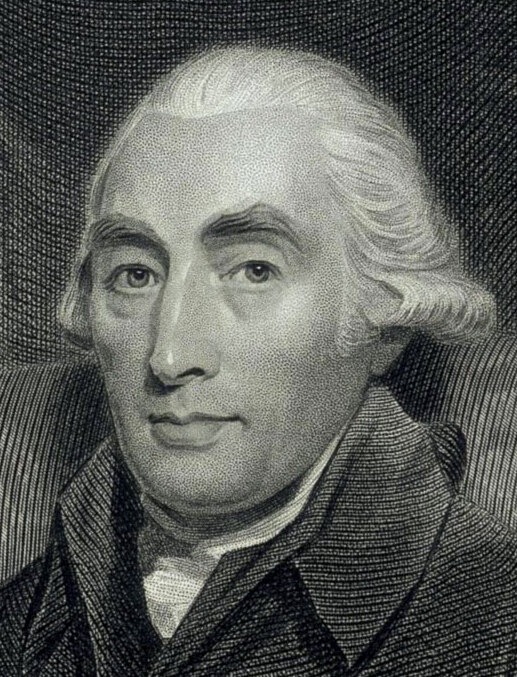
Joseph Black

Bodies were capable of holding a certain amount of this fluid, leading to the term heat capacity, named and first investigated by Scottish chemist Joseph Black in the 1750s.

In the mid- to late 19th century, heat became understood as a manifestation of a system's internal energy. Today heat is seen as the transfer of disordered thermal energy. Nevertheless, at least in English, the term heat capacity survives. In some other languages, the term thermal capacity is preferred, and it is also sometimes used in English.

==== Steam engines ====
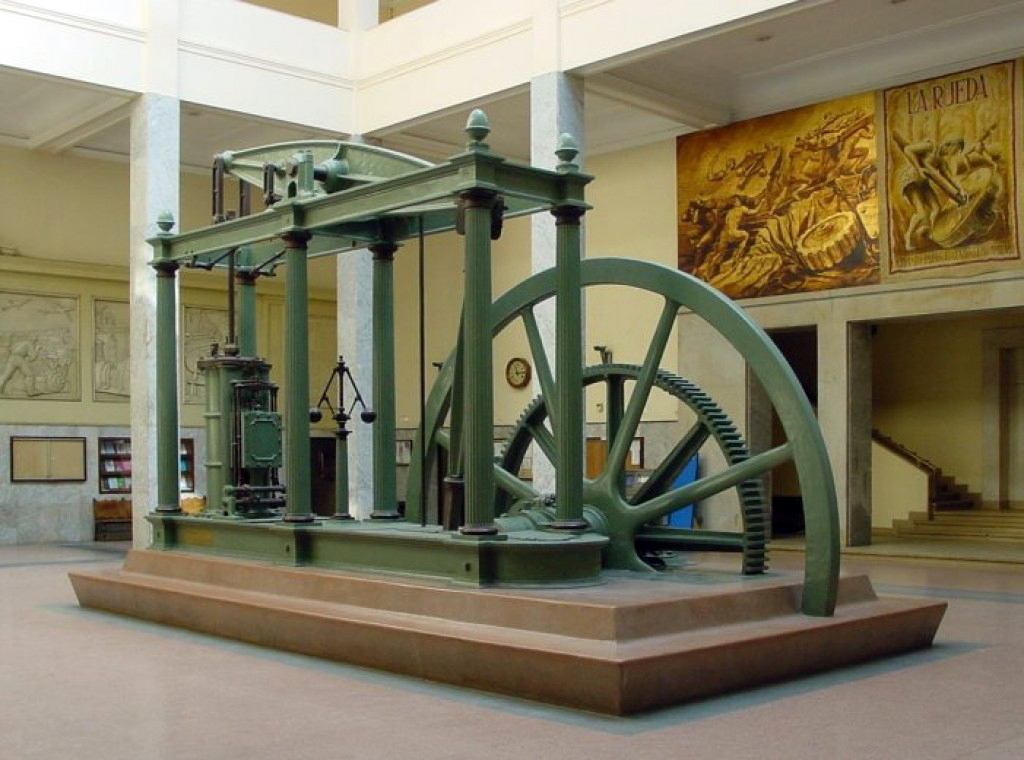
A Watt steam engine, the steam engine that propelled the Industrial Revolution in Britain and the world

Prior to 1698 and the invention of the Savery engine, horses were used to power pulleys, attached to buckets, which lifted water out of flooded salt mines in England. In the years to follow, more variations of steam engines were built, such as the Newcomen engine, and later the Watt engine. In time, these early engines would eventually be utilized in place of horses. Thus, each engine began to be associated with a certain amount of "horse power" depending upon how many horses it had replaced. The main problem with these first engines was that they were slow and clumsy, converting less than 2% of the input fuel into useful work. In other words, large quantities of coal (or wood) had to be burned to yield only a small fraction of work output. Hence the need for a new science of engine dynamics was born.

==== Caloric theory ====
In the mid- to late 18th century, heat was thought to be a measurement of an invisible fluid, known as the caloric. Like phlogiston, caloric was presumed to be the "substance" of heat that would flow from a hotter body to a cooler body, thus warming it. The utility and explanatory power of kinetic theory, however, soon started to displace the caloric theory. Nevertheless, William Thomson, for example, was still trying to explain James Joule's observations within a caloric framework as late as 1850. The caloric theory was largely obsolete by the end of the 19th century.

==== Calorimetry ====
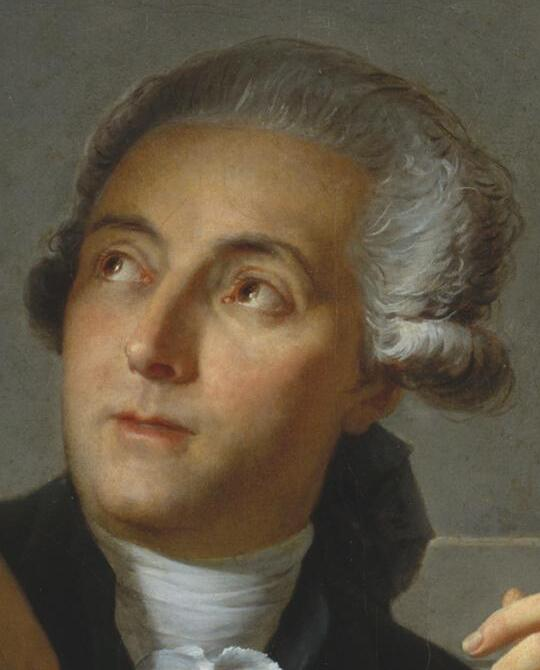
Antoine Lavoisier

Joseph Black and Antoine Lavoisier made important contributions in the precise measurement of heat changes using the calorimeter, a subject which became known as thermochemistry. The development of the steam engine focused attention on calorimetry and the amount of heat produced from different types of coal. The first quantitative research on the heat changes during chemical reactions was initiated by Lavoisier using an ice calorimeter following research by Joseph Black on the latent heat of water.

=== Thermal conduction and thermal radiation ===
Carl Wilhelm Scheele distinguished heat transfer by thermal radiation (radiant heat) from that by convection and conduction in 1777.

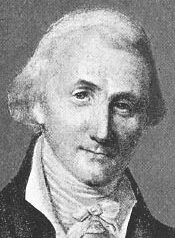
Pierre Prévost

In the 17th century, it came to be believed that all materials had an identical conductivity and that differences in sensation arose from their different heat capacities. Suggestions that this might not be the case came from the new science of electricity in which it was easily apparent that some materials were good electrical conductors while others were effective insulators. Jan Ingen-Housz in 1785-9 made some of the earliest measurements, as did Benjamin Thompson during the same period.

In 1791, Pierre Prévost showed that all bodies radiate heat, no matter how hot or cold they are. In 1804, Sir John Leslie observed that a matte black surface radiates heat more effectively than a polished surface, suggesting the importance of black-body radiation.

=== Heat and friction (Rumford) ===
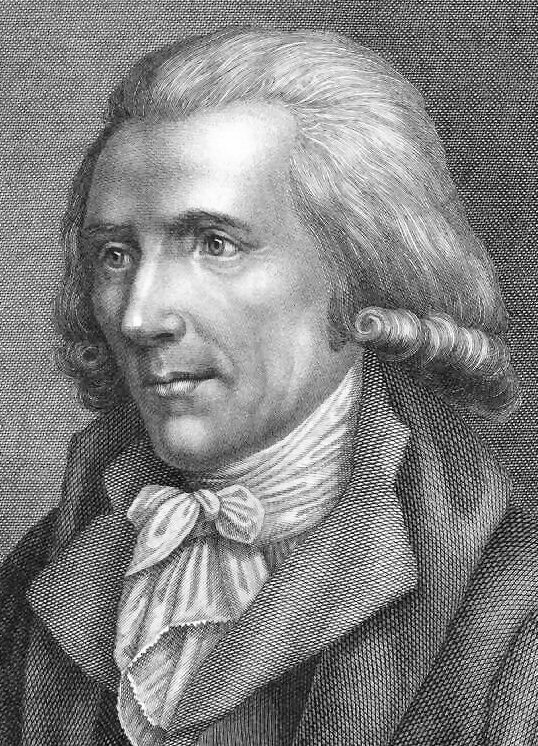
Benjamin Thompson

In the 19th century, scientists abandoned the idea of a physical caloric. The first substantial experimental challenges to the caloric theory arose in a work by Benjamin Thompson's (Count Rumford) from 1798, in which he showed that boring cast iron cannons produced great amounts of heat which he ascribed to friction. His work was among the first to undermine the caloric theory.

As a result of his experiments in 1798, Thompson suggested that heat was a form of motion, though no attempt was made to reconcile theoretical and experimental approaches, and it is unlikely that he was thinking of the vis viva principle.

== Early 19th century ==
=== Modern thermodynamics (Carnot) ===
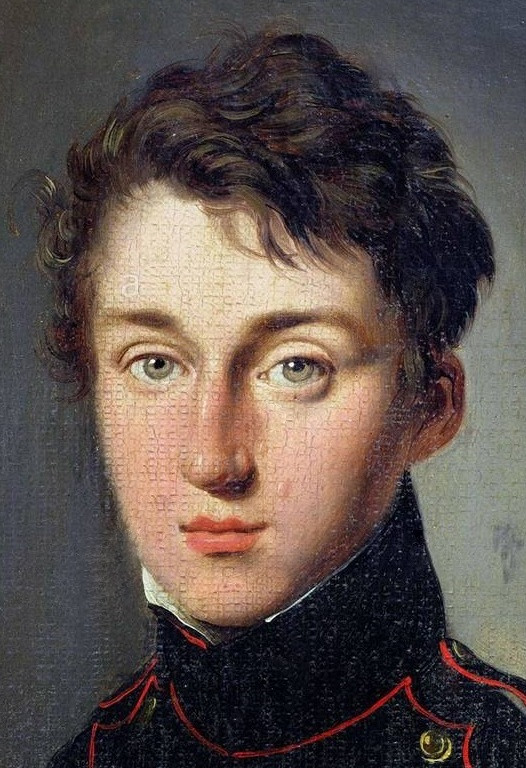
Sadi Carnot (1796–1832): the "father" of thermodynamics

Although early steam engines were crude and inefficient, they attracted the attention of the leading scientists of the time. One such scientist was Sadi Carnot, the "father of thermodynamics", who in 1824 published Reflections on the Motive Power of Fire, a discourse on heat, power, and engine efficiency. Most cite this book as the starting point for thermodynamics as a modern science. (The name "thermodynamics", however, did not arrive until 1854, when the British mathematician and physicist William Thomson (Lord Kelvin) coined the term thermo-dynamics in his paper On the Dynamical Theory of Heat.)

Carnot defined "motive power" to be the expression of the useful effect that a motor is capable of producing. Herein, Carnot introduced us to the first modern day definition of "work": weight lifted through a height. The desire to understand, via formulation, this useful effect in relation to "work" is at the core of all modern day thermodynamics.

Even though he was working with the caloric theory, Carnot in 1824 suggested that some of the caloric available for generating useful work is lost in any real process.

=== Reflection, refraction, and polarisation of radiant heat ===
Though it had come to be suspected from Scheele's work, in 1831 Macedonio Melloni demonstrated that radiant heat could be reflected, refracted and polarised in the same way as light.

=== Kinetic theory (early 19th century) ===
John Herapath independently formulated a kinetic theory in 1820, but mistakenly associated temperature with momentum rather than vis viva or kinetic energy. His work ultimately failed peer review, even from someone as well-disposed to the kinetic principle as Humphry Davy, and was neglected.

John James Waterston in 1843 provided a largely accurate account, again independently, but his work received the same reception, failing peer review.

Further progress in kinetic theory started only in the middle of the 19th century, with the works of Rudolf Clausius, James Clerk Maxwell, and Ludwig Boltzmann.

=== Mechanical equivalent of heat ===
Quantitative studies by Joule from 1843 onwards provided soundly reproducible phenomena, and helped to place the subject of thermodynamics on a solid footing. In 1843, Joule experimentally found the mechanical equivalent of heat. In 1845, Joule reported his best-known experiment, involving the use of a falling weight to spin a paddle-wheel in a barrel of water, which allowed him to estimate a mechanical equivalent of heat of 819 ft·lbf/Btu (4.41 J/cal). This led to the theory of conservation of energy and explained why heat can do work.

=== Absolute zero and the Kelvin scale ===
The idea of absolute zero was generalised in 1848 by Lord Kelvin.

== Late 19th century ==
=== Entropy and the second law of thermodynamics ===
==== Lord Kelvin ====
In March 1851, while grappling to come to terms with the work of Joule, Lord Kelvin started to speculate that there was an inevitable loss of useful heat in all processes. The idea was framed even more dramatically by Hermann von Helmholtz in 1854, giving birth to the spectre of the heat death of the universe.

==== William Rankine ====
In 1854, William John Macquorn Rankine started to make use of what he called thermodynamic function in calculations. This has subsequently been shown to be identical to the concept of entropy formulated by the famed mathematical physicist Rudolf Clausius.

==== Rudolf Clausius ====
In 1865, Clausius coined the term "entropy" (das Wärmegewicht, symbolized S) to denote heat lost or turned into waste. ("Wärmegewicht" translates literally as "heat-weight"; the corresponding English term stems from the Greek τρέπω, "I turn".) Clausius used the concept to develop his classic statement of the second law of thermodynamics the same year.

=== Statistical thermodynamics ===
==== Temperature is average kinetic energy of molecules ====
In his 1857 work On the nature of the motion called heat, Clausius for the first time clearly states that heat is the average kinetic energy of molecules.

==== Maxwell–Boltzmann distribution ====
Clausius' above statement interested the Scottish mathematician and physicist James Clerk Maxwell, who in 1859 derived the momentum distribution later named after him. The Austrian physicist Ludwig Boltzmann subsequently generalized this distribution for the case of gases in external fields. In association with Clausius, in 1871, Maxwell formulated a new branch of thermodynamics called statistical thermodynamics, which functions to analyze large numbers of particles at equilibrium, i.e., systems where no changes are occurring, such that only their average properties as temperature T, pressure P, and volume V become important.

==== Degrees of freedom ====
Boltzmann is perhaps the most significant contributor to kinetic theory, as he introduced many of the fundamental concepts in the theory. Besides the Maxwell–Boltzmann distribution mentioned above, he also associated the kinetic energy of particles with their degrees of freedom. The Boltzmann equation for the distribution function of a gas in non-equilibrium states is still the most effective equation for studying transport phenomena in gases and metals. By introducing the concept of thermodynamic probability as the number of microstates corresponding to the current macrostate, he showed that its logarithm is proportional to entropy.

==== Definition of entropy ====
In 1875, the Austrian physicist Ludwig Boltzmann formulated a precise connection between entropy S and molecular motion:

$$S=k\log W  \,$$

being defined in terms of the number of possible states W that such motion could occupy, where k is the Boltzmann constant.

==== Gibbs free energy ====
In 1876, chemical engineer Willard Gibbs published an obscure 300-page paper titled: On the Equilibrium of Heterogeneous Substances, wherein he formulated one grand equality, the Gibbs free energy equation, which suggested a measure of the amount of "useful work" attainable in reacting systems.

=== Enthalpy ===
Gibbs also originated the concept we now know as enthalpy H, calling it "a heat function for constant pressure". The modern word enthalpy would be coined many years later by Heike Kamerlingh Onnes, who based it on the Greek word enthalpein meaning to warm.

=== Stefan–Boltzmann law ===
James Clerk Maxwell's 1862 insight that both light and radiant heat were forms of electromagnetic wave led to the start of the quantitative analysis of thermal radiation. In 1879, Jožef Stefan observed that the total radiant flux from a blackbody is proportional to the fourth power of its temperature and stated the Stefan–Boltzmann law. The law was derived theoretically by Ludwig Boltzmann in 1884.

== 20th century ==
=== Quantum thermodynamics ===
In 1900 Max Planck found an accurate formula for the spectrum of black-body radiation. Fitting new data required the introduction of a new constant, known as the Planck constant, the fundamental constant of modern physics. Looking at the radiation as coming from a cavity oscillator in thermal equilibrium, the formula suggested that energy in a cavity occurs only in multiples of frequency times the constant. That is, it is quantized. This avoided a divergence to which the theory would lead without the quantization.

=== Third law of thermodynamics ===
In 1906, Walther Nernst stated the third law of thermodynamics.

=== Erwin Schrödinger ===
Building on the foundations above, Lars Onsager, Erwin Schrödinger, Ilya Prigogine and others, brought these engine "concepts" into the thoroughfare of almost every modern-day branch of science.

== Branches of thermodynamics ==
The following list is a rough disciplinary outline of the major branches of thermodynamics and their time of inception:

- Thermochemistry – 1780s
- Classical thermodynamics – 1824
- Chemical thermodynamics – 1876
- Statistical mechanics – c. 1880s
- Equilibrium thermodynamics
- Engineering thermodynamics
- Chemical engineering thermodynamics – c. 1940s
- Non-equilibrium thermodynamics – 1941
- Small systems thermodynamics – 1960s
- Biological thermodynamics – 1957
- Ecosystem thermodynamics – 1959
- Relativistic thermodynamics – 1965
- Rational thermodynamics – 1960s
- Quantum thermodynamics – 1968
- Black hole thermodynamics – c. 1970s
- Theory of critical phenomena and use of renormalization group theory in statistical physics – 1966-1974
- Geological thermodynamics – c. 1970s
- Biological evolution thermodynamics – 1978
- Geochemical thermodynamics – c. 1980s
- Atmospheric thermodynamics – c. 1980s
- Natural systems thermodynamics – 1990s
- Supramolecular thermodynamics – 1990s
- Earthquake thermodynamics – 2000
- Drug-receptor thermodynamics – 2001
- Pharmaceutical systems thermodynamics – 2002

Concepts of thermodynamics have also been applied in other fields, for example:

- Thermoeconomics – c. 1970s

== See also ==
- History of chemistry
- Timeline of heat engine technology
- Timeline of low-temperature technology
- Timeline of thermodynamics
