= Charles de Haldat du Lys =

French physicist

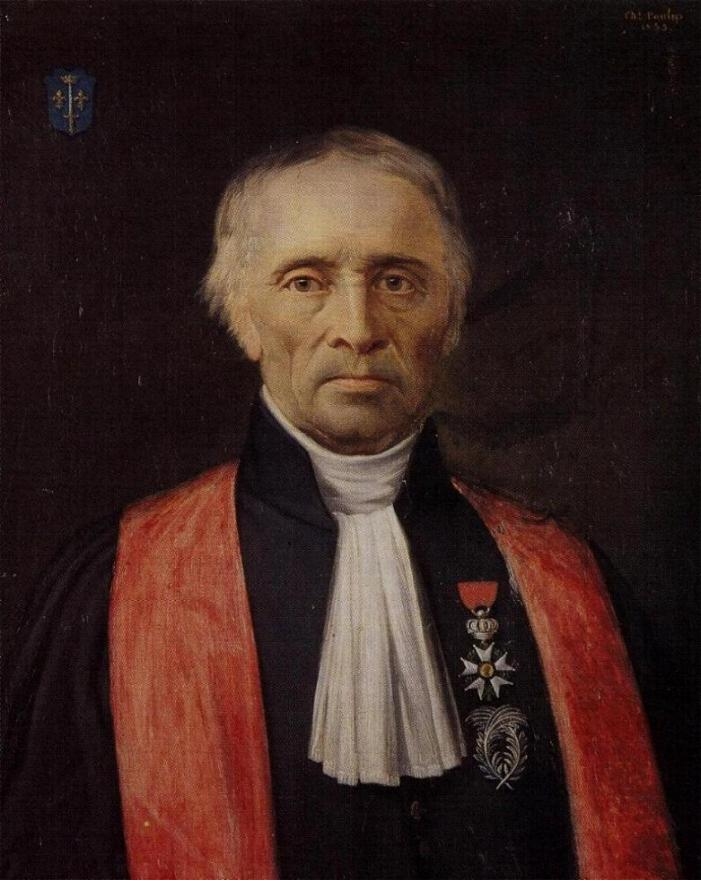

Charles Nicolas Alexandre Haldat du Lys (24 December 1770 – 26 November 1852) was a French physicist who performed experimental work in hydrostatics.

He was a critic of the reliability of Benjamin Thompson's researches on the generation of heat, An Inquiry Concerning the Source of the Heat Which Is Excited by Friction.

== Bibliography ==
- Cardwell, D.S.L. (1971). From Watt to Clausius: The Rise of Thermodynamics in the Early Industrial Age. Heinemann: London. ISBN 0-435-54150-1.
- Haldat, C.N.A. (1810). "Inquiries concerning the heat produced by friction". Journal de Physique. 65: 213.
