= An Inquiry Concerning the Source of the Heat Which Is Excited by Friction =

1798 scientific paper by Benjamin Thompson

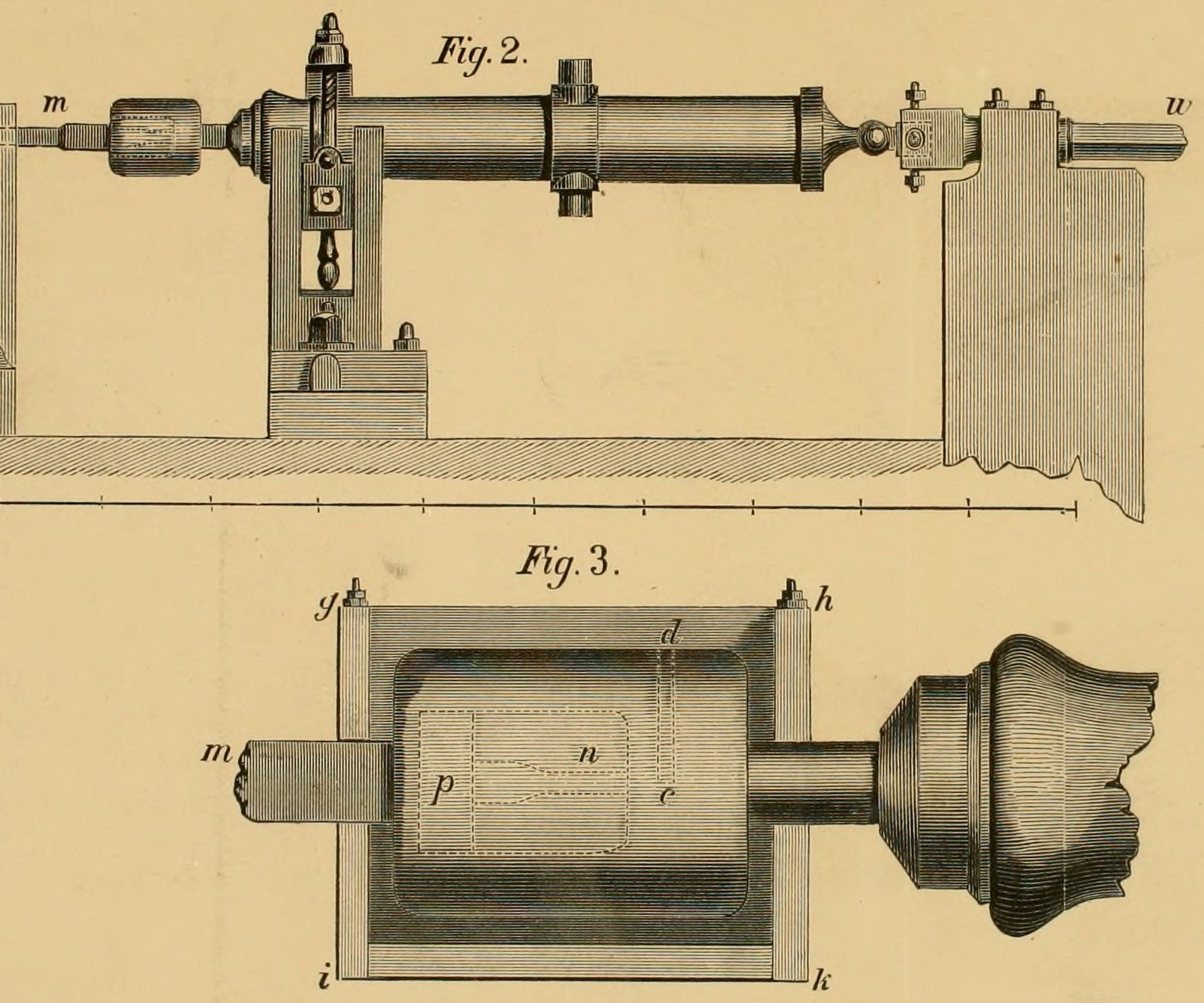
Diagram of Rumford's cannon boring experiment

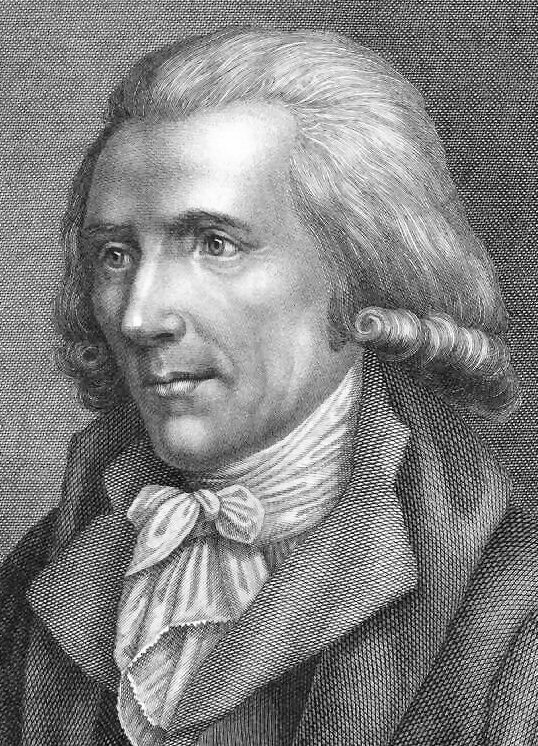
Benjamin Thompson

"An Inquiry Concerning the Source of the Heat Which Is Excited by Friction" is a scientific paper by Benjamin Thompson, Count Rumford, which was published in the Philosophical Transactions of the Royal Society in 1798. The paper provided a substantial challenge to established theories of heat, and began the 19th century revolution in thermodynamics.

== Background ==
Rumford was an opponent of the caloric theory of heat which held that heat is a fluid that could be neither created nor destroyed. He had further developed the view that all gases and liquids are absolute non-conductors of heat. His views were out of step with the accepted science of the time and the latter theory had particularly been attacked by John Dalton and John Leslie.

Rumford was heavily influenced by the argument from design and it is likely that he wished to grant water a privileged and providential status in the regulation of human life.

Though Rumford was to come to associate heat with motion, there is no evidence that he was committed to the kinetic theory or the principle of vis viva.

In his 1798 paper, Rumford acknowledged that he had predecessors in the notion that heat was a form of motion. (Note: "Before I finish this paper, I would beg leave to observe, that although, in treating the subject I have endeavoured to investigate, I have made no mention of the names of those who have gone over the same ground before me, nor of the success of their labours; this omission has not been owing to any want of respect for my predecessors, but was merely to avoid prolixity, and to be more at liberty to pursue, without interruption, the natural train of my own ideas.") Those predecessors included Francis Bacon, (Note: In his Novum Organum, Francis Bacon concludes that heat is the motion of the particles composing matter. From p. 164 "Heat appears to be Motion." From p. 165: "The very essence of Heat, or the Substantial self of Heat, is motion and nothing else." From p. 168: "Heat is not a uniform Expansive Motion of the whole, but of the small particles of the body.") Robert Boyle, (Note: At the conclusion of Experiment VI, Boyle notes that if a nail is driven completely into a piece of wood, then further blows with the hammer cause it to become hot as the hammer's force is transformed into random motion of the nail's atoms. From pp. 61-62: "The impulse given by the stroke, being unable either to drive the nail further on, or destroy its interness [i.e., entireness, integrity], must be spent in making various vehement and intestine commotion of the parts among themselves, and in such an one we formerly observed the nature of heat to consist.") Robert Hooke, (Note: From p. 116: "Now Heat, as I shall afterward prove, is nothing but the internal Motion of the Particles of [a] Body; and the hotter a Body is, the more violently are the Particles moved.") John Locke, (Note: From p. 224: "Heat, is a very brisk agitation of the insensible parts of the object, which produces in us that sensation, from whence we denominate the object hot: so what in our sensation is heat, in the object is nothing but motion. This appears by the way, whereby heat is produc'd: for we see that the rubbing of a brass-nail upon a board, will make it very hot; and the axle-trees of carts and coaches are often hot, and sometimes to a degree, that it sets them on fire, by rubbing of the nave of the wheel upon it.") and Henry Cavendish. (Note: From the footnote continued on p. 313: "I think Sir Isaac Newton's opinion, that heat consists in the internal motion of the particles of bodies, much the most probable.")

== Experiments ==
Rumford had observed the frictional heat generated by boring out cannon barrels at the arsenal in Munich. At that time, cannons were cast at the foundry with an extra section of metal forward of what would become the muzzle, and this section was removed and discarded later in the manufacturing process. (Note: From the footnotes on p. 84 of Rumford's paper of 1798: "For fear I should be suspected of prodigality in the prosecution of my philosophical researches, I think it necessary to inform the Society, that the cannon I made use of in this experiment was not sacrificed to it. The short hollow cylinder which was formed at the end of it, was turned out of a cylindrical mass of metal, about 2 feet in length, projecting beyond the muzzle of the gun, called in the German language the verlorner kopf, (the head of the cannon to be thrown away) and which is represented in fig. 1.") Rumford took an unfinished cannon and modified this section to allow it to be enclosed by a watertight box while a blunted boring tool was used on it. He showed that water in this box could be boiled within roughly two and a half hours, and that the supply of frictional heat was seemingly inexhaustible. Rumford confirmed that no physical change had taken place in the material of the cannon by comparing the specific heats of the material machined away and that remaining were the same.

Rumford also argued that the seemingly indefinite generation of heat was incompatible with the caloric theory. He contended that the only thing communicated to the barrel was motion.

Rumford made no attempt to further quantify the heat generated or to measure the mechanical equivalent of heat.

== Reception ==
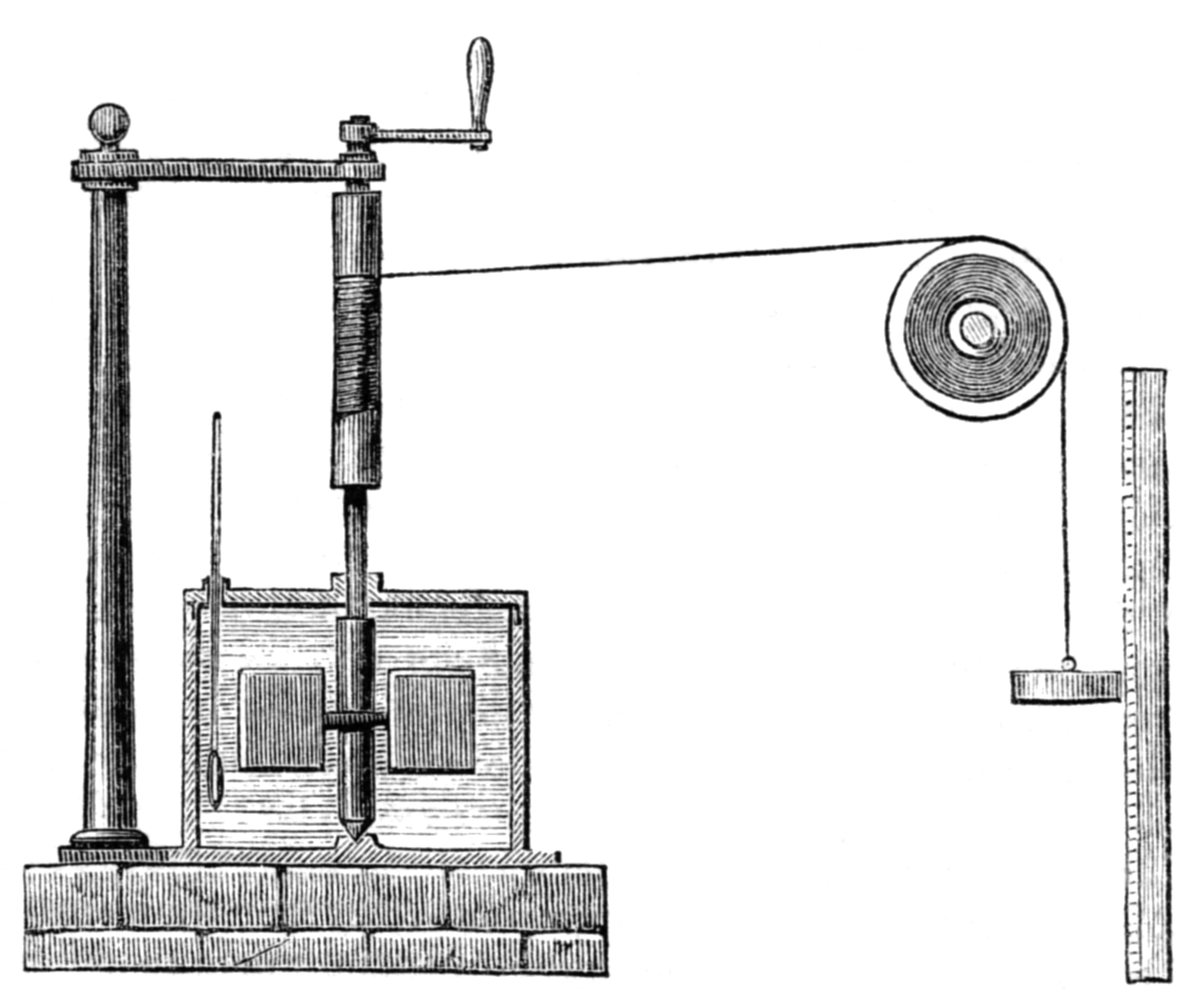
Joule's apparatus for measuring the mechanical equivalent of heat.

Most established scientists, such as William Henry, as well as Thomas Thomson, believed that there was enough uncertainty in the caloric theory to allow its adaptation to account for the new results. It had certainly proved robust and adaptable up to that time. Furthermore, Thomson, Jöns Jakob Berzelius, and Antoine César Becquerel observed that electricity could be indefinitely generated by friction. No educated scientist of the time was willing to hold that electricity was not a fluid.

Ultimately, Rumford's claim of the "inexhaustible" supply of heat was a reckless extrapolation from the study. Charles Haldat made some penetrating criticisms of the reproducibility of Rumford's results and it is possible to see the whole experiment as somewhat tendentious.

However, the experiment inspired the work of James Prescott Joule in the 1840s. Joule's more exact measurements were pivotal in establishing the kinetic theory at the expense of caloric.

== Bibliography ==
- Cardwell, D.S.L. (1971). From Watt to Clausius: The Rise of Thermodynamics in the Early Industrial Age. Heinemann: London. ISBN 0-435-54150-1.
