= Energetics =

Energetics is the study of energy, and may refer to:

- Thermodynamics, branch of physics and chemistry that deals with energy, work and heat
- Bioenergetics, field in biochemistry that concerns energy flow through living systems and cells
- Energy flow (ecology), study of the energy balance through living things within an ecosystem
- Energeticism, obsolete microscopic theory of chemistry
- Energetic materials, refers to explosives, propellants or pyrotechnic materials which rapidly release energy when subjected to an initiating stimulus
