= Mechanical equivalent of heat =

Concept that motion and heat are interchangeable

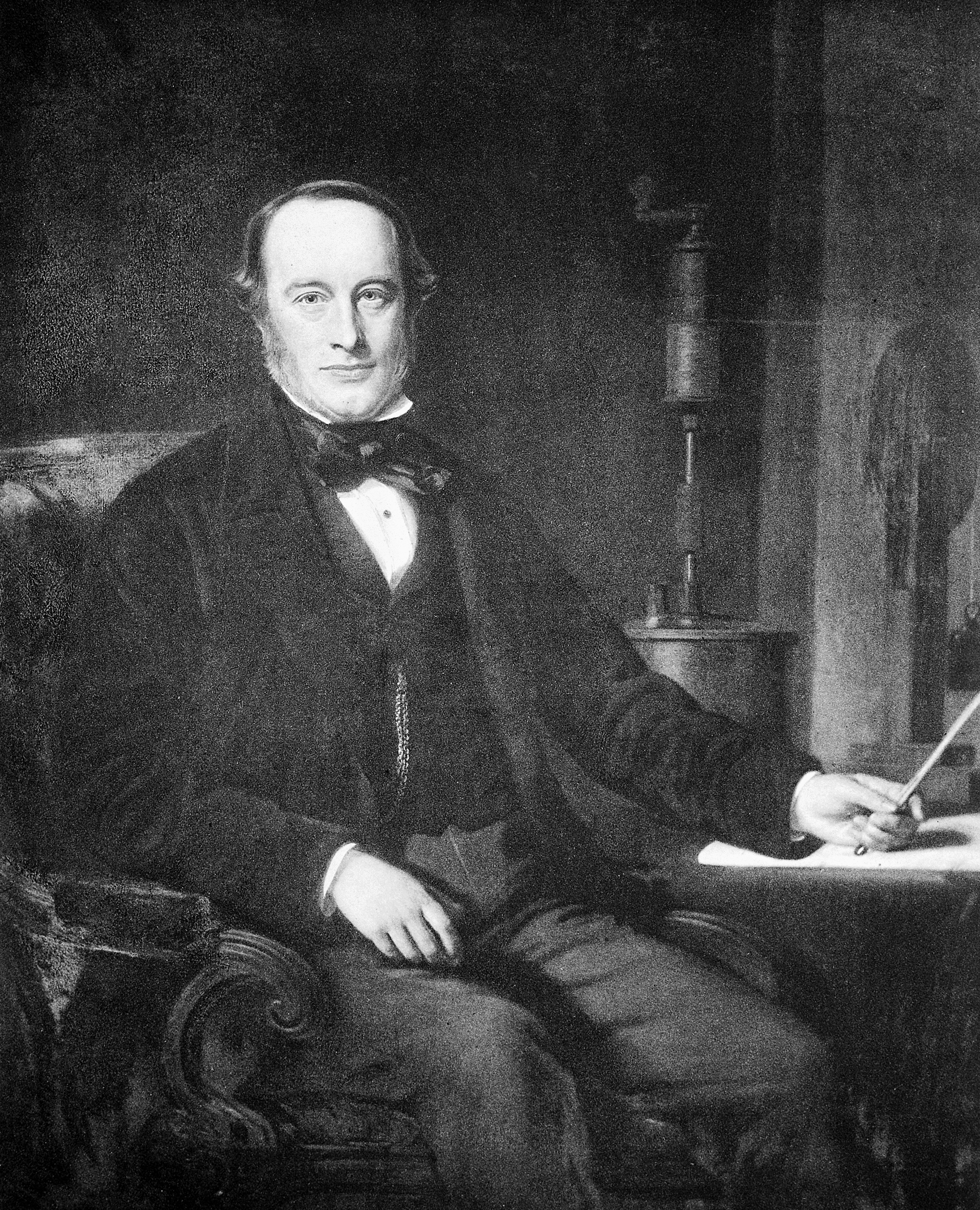
James Prescott Joule

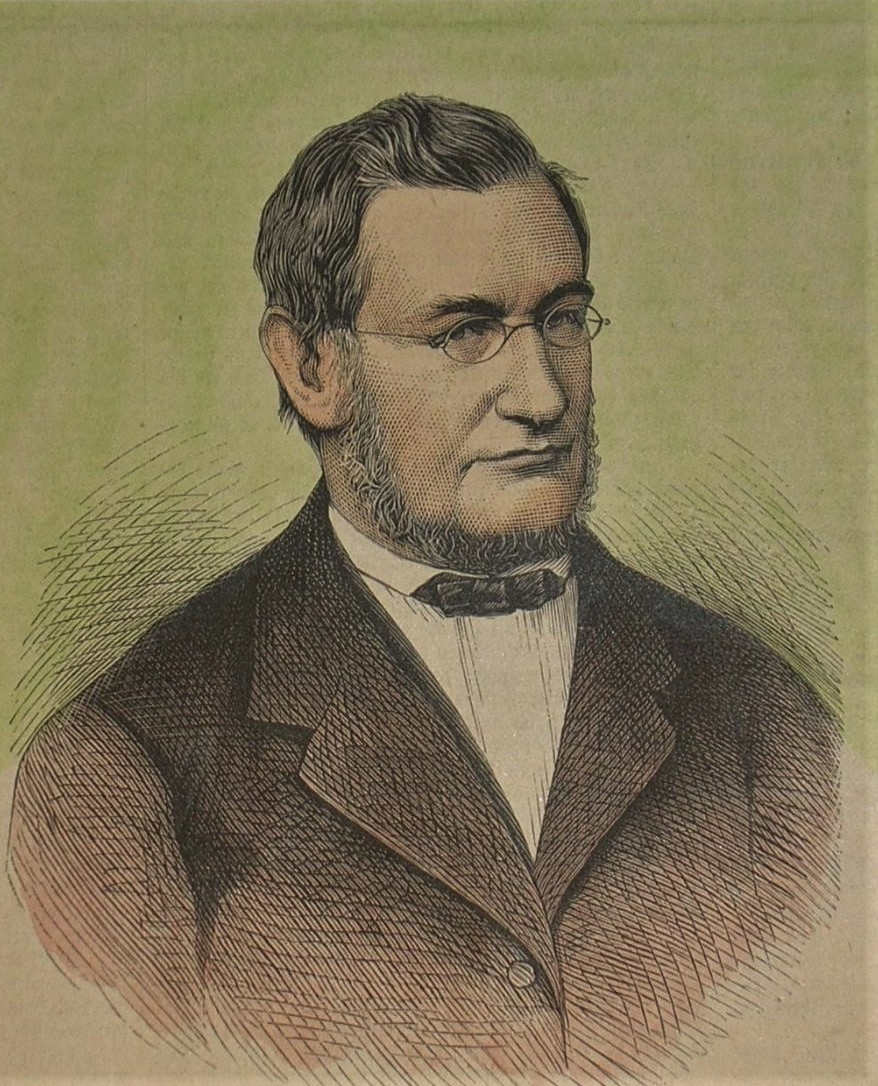
Julius Robert von Mayer

In the history of science, the mechanical equivalent of heat states that motion and heat are mutually interchangeable and that in every case, a given amount of work would generate the same amount of heat, provided the work done is totally converted to heat energy. The mechanical equivalent of heat was a concept that had an important part in the development and acceptance of the conservation of energy and the establishment of the science of thermodynamics in the 19th century. Its independent and simultaneous discovery by James Prescott Joule and by Julius Robert von Mayer led to a priority dispute.

== History and priority dispute ==
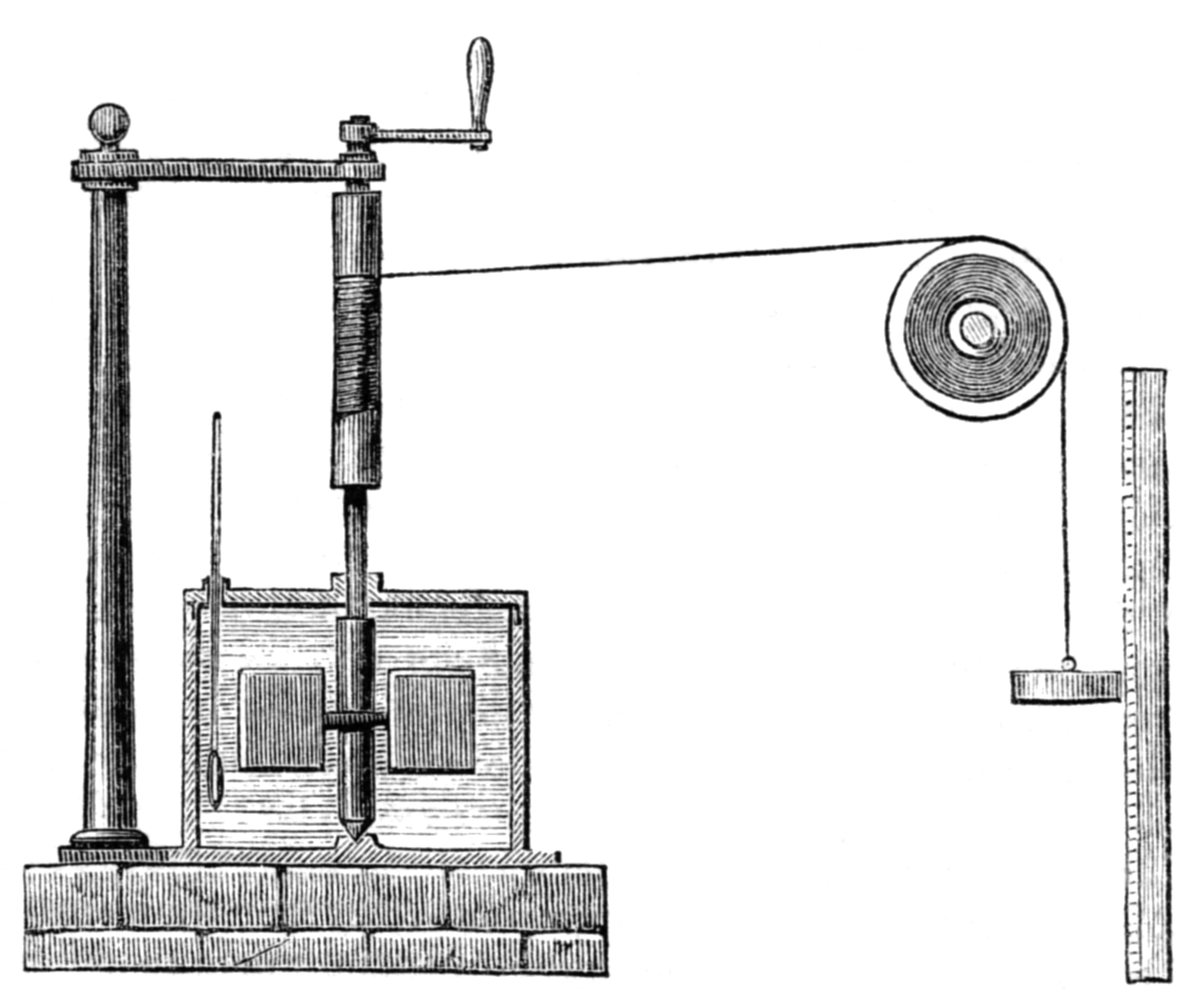
Joule's apparatus for measuring the mechanical equivalent of heat in which the "work" of the falling weight is converted into the "heat" of agitation in the water.

Benjamin Thompson, Count Rumford, had observed the frictional heat generated by boring cannon at the arsenal in Munich, Bavaria, circa 1797. Rumford immersed a cannon barrel in water and arranged for a specially blunted boring tool. He showed that the water could be boiled within roughly two and a half hours and that the supply of frictional heat was seemingly inexhaustible.

Based on his experiments, he published "An Inquiry Concerning the Source of the Heat Which Is Excited by Friction", (1798), Philosophical Transactions of the Royal Society p. 102. This scientific paper provided a substantial challenge to established theories of heat and began the 19th century revolution in thermodynamics. The experiment inspired the work of James Prescott Joule in the 1840s. Joule's more exact measurements on equivalence were pivotal in establishing the kinetic theory at the expense of the caloric theory. The idea that heat and work are equivalent was also proposed by Julius Robert von Mayer in 1842 in the leading German physics journal and independently by James Prescott Joule in 1843, in the leading British physics journal. Similar work was carried out by Ludwig A. Colding in 1840–1843, though Colding's work was little known outside his native Denmark.

A collaboration between Nicolas Clément and Sadi Carnot in the 1820s had some related thinking near the same lines. In 1845, Joule published a paper entitled "The Mechanical Equivalent of Heat", in which he specified a numerical value for the amount of mechanical work required to produce a unit of heat. In particular Joule had experimented on the amount of mechanical work generated by friction needed to raise the temperature of a pound of water by one degree Fahrenheit and found a consistent value of 778.24 foot pound force (4.1550 J·cal^{−1}). Joule contended that motion and heat were mutually interchangeable and that, in every case, a given amount of work would generate the same amount of heat. Von Mayer also published a numerical value for mechanical equivalent of heat in 1845 but his experimental method wasn't as convincing.

Though a standardised value of 4.1860 J·cal^{−1} was established in the early 20th century, in the 1920s, it was ultimately realised that the constant has magnitude close to the specific heat of water, a quantity that varies with temperature between the values of 4.17 and 4.22 J·g^{−1}·°C^{−1}. The change in unit was the result of the demise of the calorie as a unit in physics and chemistry.

Both von Mayer and Joule met with initial neglect and resistance despite having published in leading European physics journals, but by 1847, a lot of leading scientists of the day were paying attention. Hermann Helmholtz in 1847 published what is considered a definitive declaration of the conservation of energy. Helmholtz had learned from reading Joule's publications, though Helmholtz eventually came around to crediting both Joule and von Mayer for priority.

Also in 1847, Joule made a well-attended presentation at the annual meeting of British Association for the Advancement of Science. Among those in attendance was William Thomson. Thomson was intrigued but initially skeptical. Over the next two years, Thomson became increasingly convinced of Joule's theory, finally admitting his conviction in print in 1851, simultaneously crediting von Mayer. Thomson collaborated with Joule, mainly by correspondence, Joule conducting experiments, Thomson analysing the results and suggesting further experiments. The collaboration lasted from 1852 to 1856. Its published results did much to bring about general acceptance of Joule's work and the kinetic theory.

However, in 1848, von Mayer had first had sight of Joule's papers and wrote to the French Académie des Sciences to assert priority. His letter was published in the Comptes Rendus and Joule was quick to react. Thomson's close relationship with Joule allowed him to become dragged into the controversy. The pair planned that Joule would admit von Mayer's priority for the idea of the mechanical equivalent but to claim that experimental verification rested with Joule. Thomson's associates, co-workers and relatives such as William John Macquorn Rankine, James Thomson, James Clerk Maxwell, and Peter Guthrie Tait joined to champion Joule's cause.

However, in 1862, John Tyndall, in one of his many excursions into popular science and many public disputes with Thomson and his circle, gave a lecture at the Royal Institution entitled On Force in which he credited von Mayer with conceiving and measuring the mechanical equivalent of heat. Thomson and Tait were angered, and an undignified public exchange of correspondence took place in the pages of the Philosophical Magazine, and the rather more popular Good Words. Tait even resorted to championing Colding's cause in an attempt to undermine von Mayer.

Though Tyndall again pressed von Mayer's cause in Heat: A Mode of Motion (1863) with the publication of Sir Henry Enfield Roscoe's Edinburgh Review article Thermo-Dynamics in January 1864, Joule's reputation was sealed while that of von Mayer entered a period of obscurity.

== Notes ==
1. The usage of terms such as work, force, energy, power, etc. in the 18th and 19th centuries by scientific workers does not necessarily reflect the standardised modern usage.
