= Caloric theory =

Obsolete scientific theory of heat flow

The caloric theory is a superseded scientific theory that heat consists of a self-repellent fluid called "caloric" that flows from hotter bodies to colder bodies. Caloric was also thought of as a weightless gas that could pass in and out of pores in solids and liquids. The caloric theory was superseded by the mid-19th century in favor of the mechanical equivalent of heat, but nevertheless persisted in some scientific literature—particularly in more popular treatments—until the end of the 19th century.

== Early history ==
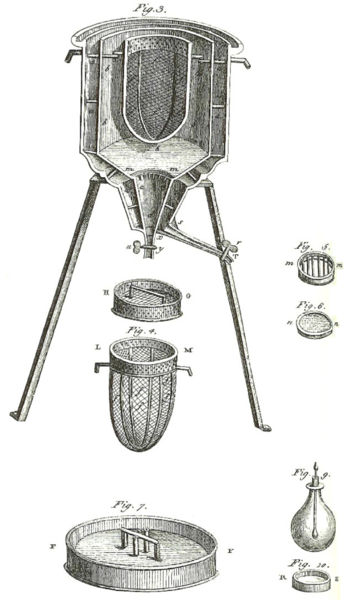
The world's first ice-calorimeter, used in the winter of 1782–83, by Antoine Lavoisier and Pierre-Simon Laplace, to determine the heat involved in various chemical changes; calculations which were based on Joseph Black’s prior discovery of latent heat. These experiments mark the foundation of thermochemistry.

=== Phlogiston theory is replaced by combustion in oxygen ===
In the history of thermodynamics, the initial explanations of heat were thoroughly confused with explanations of combustion. After J. J. Becher and Georg Ernst Stahl introduced the phlogiston theory of combustion in the 17th century, phlogiston was thought to be the substance of heat.

There is one version of the caloric theory that was introduced by Antoine Lavoisier. Prior to Lavoisier's caloric theory, published references concerning heat and its existence, outside of being an agent for chemical reactions, were sparse only having been offered by Joseph Black in Rozier's Journal (1772) citing the melting temperature of ice. In response to Black, Lavoisier's private manuscripts revealed that he had encountered the same phenomena of a fixed melting point for ice and mentioned that he had already formulated an explanation which he had not published as of yet. Lavoisier developed the explanation of combustion in terms of oxygen in the 1770s.

=== Igneous fluid ===
On 28 June and 13 July 1783, Lavoisier read his two-part manuscript Reflections on phlogiston (Réflexions sur le phlogistique) (Note: Full title: Reflections on phlogiston, to serve as a continuation of the theory of combustion and calcination, published in 1777 (French: Réflexions sur le phlogistique, pour servir de suite à la théorie de la combustion et de la calcination, publiée en 1777).) at the Royal Academy of Sciences in Paris. In this paper Lavoisier argued that the phlogiston theory was inconsistent with his experimental results, and proposed a 'subtle fluid' he named “igneous fluid” as the substance of heat. Lavoisier argued that this “igneous fluid” is the cause of heat, and that its existence is necessary to explain thermal expansion and contraction.

When an ordinary body—solid or fluid—is heated, that body ... occupies a larger and larger volume. If the cause of heating ceases, the body retreats ... at the same rate as it cools. Finally, if it is returned to the same temperature that it had at the first instant, it will clearly return to the same volume as it had before. Hence the corpuscles of matter do not touch each other, there exists between them a distance that heat increases and that cold decreases. One can scarcely conceive of these phenomena except by admitting the existence of a subtle fluid, the accumulation of which is the cause of heat and the absence of which is the cause of coldness. No doubt it is this fluid that lodges between the particles of matter, which spreads them apart and which occupies the space left between them. ... I name this fluid ... igneous fluid, the matter of heat and fire. I do not deny that the existence of this fluid is ... hypothetical.

=== Caloric ===
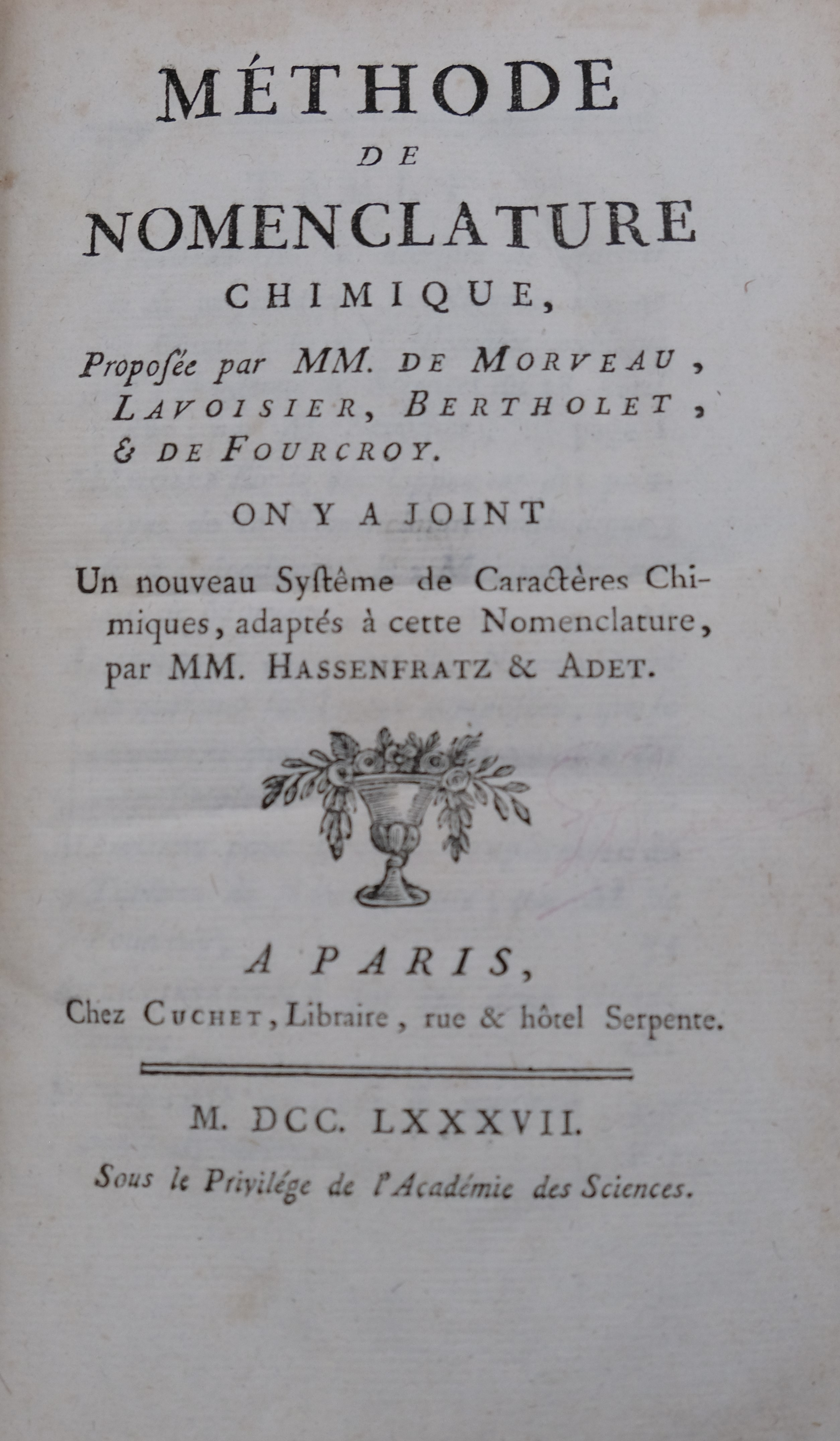
1787 copy of "Méthode de Nomenclature Chimique," featuring work by Morveau.

==== Caloric vs. heat ====
The term “caloric” was not coined until 1787, when Louis-Bernard Guyton de Morveau used calorique in a work he co-edited with Lavoisier. The word “caloric” was first used in English in a 1788 translation of Guyton de Morveau's essay by James St. John.

In his influential 1789 textbook Traité Élémentaire de Chimie, Lavoisier clarified the concept of caloric and introduced it to a wider audience. The book defined an element as a single substance that can't be broken down by chemical analysis and from which all chemical compounds are formed. He published his discovery that fermentation produces Carbon dioxide (carbonic gas) and spirit of wine, saying that it is "more appropriately called by the Arabic word alcohol since it is formed from cider or fermented sugar as well as wine", and publishing the first chemical equation "grape must = carbonic acid + alcohol", calling this reaction "one of the most extraordinary in chemistry", noting "In these experiments, we have to assume that there is a true balance or equation between the elements of the compounds with which we start and those obtained at the end of the chemical reaction."

Lavoisier emphasized that caloric was the cause of heat and therefore could not be equated with heat, i.e. not be the cause of itself. As for a definition of heat, Lavoisier offered just a simple, dictionary-style explanation:

heat ... the sensation which we call warmth being caused by the accumulation of this substance, we cannot, in strict language, distinguish it by the term heat; because the same name would then very improperly express both cause and effect. For this reason, in the memoir which I published in 1777, I gave it the names of igneous fluid and matter of heat. In [Méthode de nomenclature chimique] we have distinguished the cause of heat, or that exquisitely elastic fluid which produces it, by the term of caloric.

==== Caloric theory ====
Lavoisier was one of the first to use a calorimeter to measure the heat released during chemical reaction. Lavoisier presented the idea that caloric was a subtle fluid, obeying the common laws of matter, but attenuated to such a degree that it is capable of passing through dense matter without restraint; caloric's own material nature is evident when it is in abundance such as in the case of an explosion.

In the 1780s, Count Rumford believed that cold was a fluid, "frigoric", after the results of Pictet's experiment. Pierre Prévost argued that cold was simply a lack of caloric.

Since heat was a material substance in caloric theory, and therefore could neither be created nor destroyed, conservation of heat was a central assumption. Heat conduction was believed to have occurred as a result of the affinity between caloric and matter thus the less caloric a substance possessed, thereby being colder, attracted excess caloric from nearby atoms until a caloric, and temperature, equilibrium was reached.

Chemists of the time believed in the self-repulsion of heat particles as a fundamental force thereby making the great fluid elasticity of caloric, which does not create a repulsive force, an anomalous property which Lavoisier could not explain to his detractors.

Radiation of heat was explained by Lavoisier to be concerned with the condition of the surface of a physical body rather than the material of which it was composed. Lavoisier described a poor radiator to be a substance with a polished or smooth surface as it possessed its molecules lying in a plane closely bound together thus creating a surface layer of caloric which insulated the release of the rest within. He described a great radiator to be a substance with a rough surface as only a small amount of molecules held caloric in within a given plane allowing for greater escape from within. Count Rumford would later cite this explanation of caloric movement as insufficient to explain the radiation of cold becoming a point of contention for the theory as a whole.

The introduction of the caloric theory was influenced by the experiments of Joseph Black related to the thermal properties of materials. Besides the caloric theory, another theory existed in the late eighteenth century that could explain the phenomenon of heat: the kinetic theory. The two theories were considered to be equivalent at the time, but kinetic theory was the more modern one, as it used a few ideas from atomic theory and could explain both combustion and calorimetry. Caloric theory's inability to explain evaporation and sublimation further led to the rise of kinetic theory through the work of Count Rumford. Count Rumford observed solid mercury's tendency to melt under atmospheric conditions and thus proposed that the intensity of heat itself must stem from particle motion for such an event to occur where great heat was not expected to be.

== Successes ==
Quite a number of successful explanations can be, and were, made from these hypotheses alone. We can explain the cooling of a cup of tea in room temperature: caloric is self-repelling, and thus slowly flows from regions dense in caloric (the hot water) to regions less dense in caloric (the cooler air in the room).

We can explain the expansion of air under heat: caloric is absorbed into the air, which increases its volume. If we say a little more about what happens to caloric during this absorption phenomenon, we can explain the radiation of heat, the state changes of matter under various temperatures, and deduce nearly all of the gas laws.

Sadi Carnot, who reasoned purely on the basis of the caloric theory, developed his principle of the Carnot cycle, which still forms the basis of heat engine theory. Carnot's analysis of energy flow in steam engines (1824) marks the beginning of ideas which led thirty years later to the recognition of the second law of thermodynamics.

Caloric was believed to be capable of entering chemical reactions as a substituent inciting corresponding changes in the matter states of other substances. Lavoisier explained that the caloric quantity of a substance, and by extent the fluid elasticity of caloric, directly determined the state of the substance. Thus, changes in state were a central aspect of a chemical process and essential for a reaction where the substituents undergo changes in temperature. Changes of state had gone virtually ignored by previous chemists making the caloric theory the inception point for this class of phenomena as a subject of interest under scientific inquiry.

However, one of the greatest apparent confirmations of the caloric theory was Pierre-Simon Laplace's theoretical correction of Sir Isaac Newton’s calculation of the speed of sound. Newton had assumed an isothermal process, while Laplace, a calorist, treated it as adiabatic. This addition not only substantially corrected the theoretical prediction of the speed of sound, but also continued to make even more accurate predictions for almost a century afterward, even as measurements became more precise.

== Later developments ==
In 1798, Count Rumford published "An Inquiry Concerning the Source of the Heat Which Is Excited by Friction", a report on his investigation of the heat produced while manufacturing cannons. He had found that boring a cannon repeatedly does not result in a loss of its ability to produce heat, and therefore no loss of caloric. This suggested that caloric could not be a conserved "substance", though the experimental uncertainties in his experiment were widely debated.

His results were not seen as a "threat" to caloric theory at the time, as this theory was considered to be equivalent to the alternative kinetic theory. In fact, to some of his contemporaries, the results added to the understanding of caloric theory.

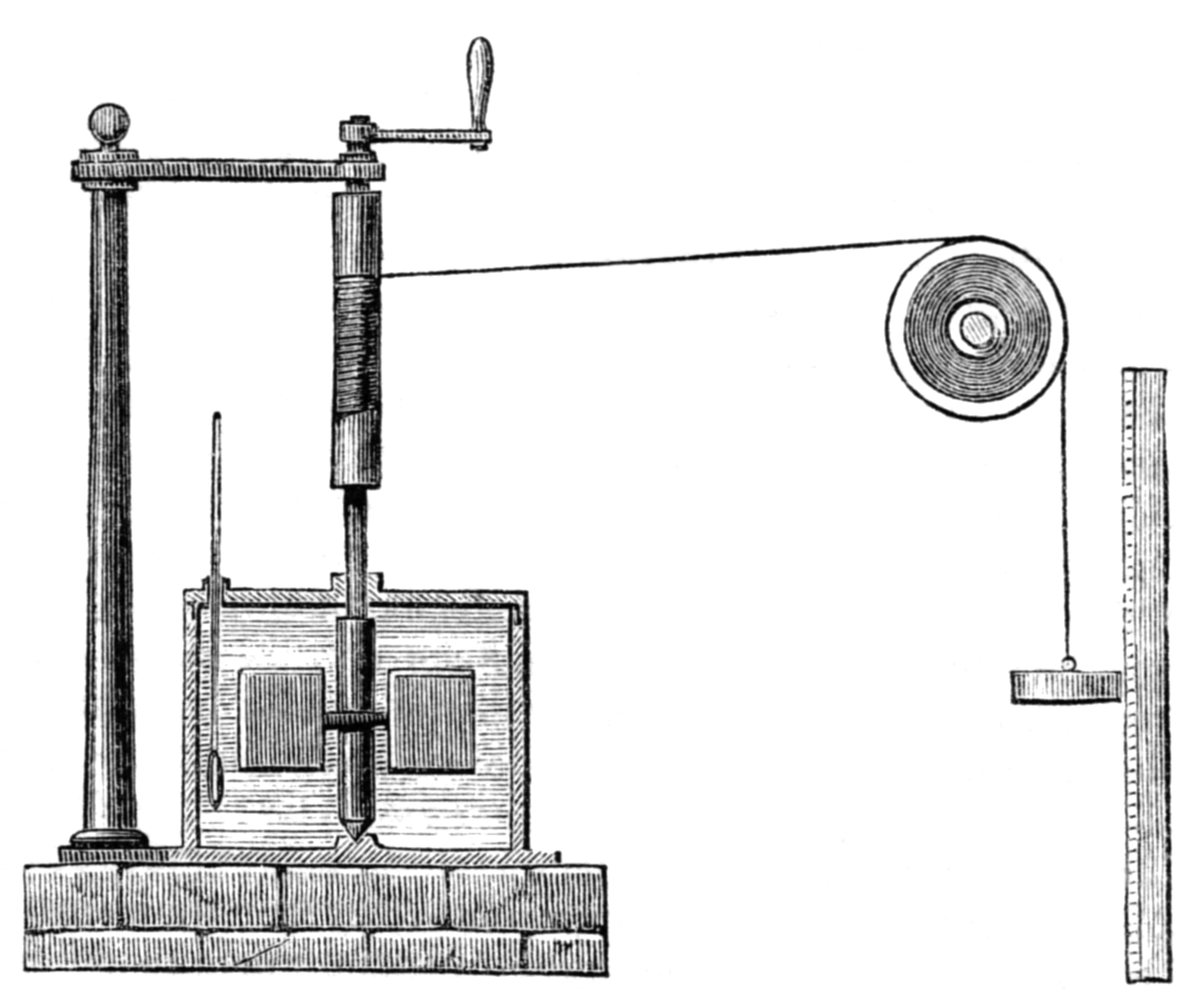
Joule's apparatus for measuring the mechanical equivalent of heat.

Rumford's experiment inspired the work of James Prescott Joule and others towards the middle of the 19th century. In 1850, Rudolf Clausius published a paper showing that the two theories were indeed compatible, as long as the calorists' principle of the conservation of heat was replaced by a principle of conservation of energy. Although compatible however, the theories differ significantly in their implications. In modern thermodynamics, heat is usually a transfer of kinetic energy of particles (atoms, molecules) from a hotter to a colder substance.

Although caloric theory was replaced during the nineteenth century by the mechanical theory of heat and modern thermodynamics, several mathematical methods developed within the caloric framework remained in use. In particular, equations such as Laplace's equation and Poisson's equation continued to appear in the study of steady-state heat conduction and temperature distributions.

== See also ==
- Chemical nomenclature
- Chemical revolution
- Energeticism
