= Entropy (order and disorder) =

Interpretation of entropy as the change in arrangement of a system's particles

Boltzmann's molecules (1896) shown at a "rest position" in a solid

In thermodynamics, entropy is often associated with the amount of order or disorder in a thermodynamic system. This stems from Rudolf Clausius' 1862 assertion that any thermodynamic process always "admits to being reduced [reduction] to the alteration in some way or another of the arrangement of the constituent parts of the working body" and that internal work associated with these alterations is quantified energetically by a measure of "entropy" change, according to the following differential expression:

$$\int\! \frac{\delta Q}{T} \ge 0$$

where Q = motional energy ("heat") that is transferred reversibly to the system from the surroundings and T = the absolute temperature at which the transfer occurs.

In the years to follow, Ludwig Boltzmann translated these 'alterations of arrangement' into a probabilistic view of order and disorder in gas-phase molecular systems. In the context of entropy, "perfect internal disorder" has often been regarded as describing thermodynamic equilibrium, but since the thermodynamic concept is so far from everyday thinking, the use of the term in physics and chemistry has caused much confusion and misunderstanding.

In recent years, to interpret the concept of entropy, by further describing the 'alterations of arrangement', there has been a shift away from the words 'order' and 'disorder', to words such as 'spread' and 'dispersal'.

== History ==
This "molecular ordering" entropy perspective traces its origins to molecular movement interpretations developed by Rudolf Clausius in the 1850s, particularly with his 1862 visual conception of molecular disgregation. Similarly, in 1859, after reading a paper on the diffusion of molecules by Clausius, Scottish physicist James Clerk Maxwell formulated the Maxwell distribution of molecular velocities, which gave the proportion of molecules having a certain velocity in a specific range. This was the first-ever statistical law in physics.

In 1864, Ludwig Boltzmann, a young student in Vienna, came across Maxwell's paper and was so inspired by it that he spent much of his long and distinguished life developing the subject further. Later, Boltzmann, in efforts to develop a kinetic theory for the behavior of a gas, applied the laws of probability to Maxwell's and Clausius' molecular interpretation of entropy so as to begin to interpret entropy in terms of order and disorder. Similarly, in 1882 Hermann von Helmholtz used the word "Unordnung" (disorder) to describe entropy.

== Overview ==
To highlight the fact that order and disorder are commonly understood to be measured in terms of entropy, below are current science encyclopedia and science dictionary definitions of entropy:

- A measure of the unavailability of a system's energy to do work; also a measure of disorder; the higher the entropy the greater the disorder.
- A measure of disorder; the higher the entropy the greater the disorder.
- In thermodynamics, a parameter representing the state of disorder of a system at the atomic, ionic, or molecular level; the greater the disorder the higher the entropy.
- A measure of disorder in the universe or of the unavailability of the energy in a system to do work.

Entropy and disorder also have associations with equilibrium. Technically, entropy, from this perspective, is defined as a thermodynamic property which serves as a measure of how close a system is to equilibrium—that is, to perfect internal disorder. Likewise, the value of the entropy of a distribution of atoms and molecules in a thermodynamic system is a measure of the disorder in the arrangements of its particles. In a stretched out piece of rubber, for example, the arrangement of the molecules of its structure has an "ordered" distribution and has zero entropy, while the "disordered" kinky distribution of the atoms and molecules in the rubber in the non-stretched state has positive entropy. Similarly, in a gas, the order is perfect and the measure of entropy of the system has its lowest value when all the molecules are in one place, whereas when more points are occupied the gas is all the more disorderly and the measure of the entropy of the system has its largest value.

In systems ecology, as another example, the entropy of a collection of items comprising a system is defined as a measure of their disorder or equivalently the relative likelihood of the instantaneous configuration of the items. Moreover, according to theoretical ecologist and chemical engineer Robert Ulanowicz, "that entropy might provide a quantification of the heretofore subjective notion of disorder has spawned innumerable scientific and philosophical narratives." In particular, many biologists have taken to speaking in terms of the entropy of an organism, or about its antonym negentropy, as a measure of the structural order within an organism.

The mathematical basis with respect to the association entropy has with order and disorder began, essentially, with the famous Boltzmann formula, $S = k_\mathrm{B} \ln W \!$, which relates entropy S to the number of possible states W in which a system can be found. As an example, consider a box that is divided into two sections. What is the probability that a certain number, or all of the particles, will be found in one section versus the other when the particles are randomly allocated to different places within the box? If you only have one particle, then that system of one particle can subsist in two states, one side of the box versus the other. If you have more than one particle, or define states as being further locational subdivisions of the box, the entropy is larger because the number of states is greater. The relationship between entropy, order, and disorder in the Boltzmann equation is so clear among physicists that according to the views of thermodynamic ecologists Sven Jorgensen and Yuri Svirezhev, "it is obvious that entropy is a measure of order or, most likely, disorder in the system." In this direction, the second law of thermodynamics, as famously enunciated by Rudolf Clausius in 1865, states that:

The entropy of the universe tends to a maximum.

Thus, if entropy is associated with disorder and if the entropy of the universe is headed towards maximal entropy, then many are often puzzled as to the nature of the "ordering" process and operation of evolution in relation to Clausius' most famous version of the second law, which states that the universe is headed towards maximal "disorder". In the recent 2003 book SYNC – the Emerging Science of Spontaneous Order by Steven Strogatz, for example, we find "Scientists have often been baffled by the existence of spontaneous order in the universe. The laws of thermodynamics seem to dictate the opposite, that nature should inexorably degenerate toward a state of greater disorder, greater entropy. Yet all around us we see magnificent structures—galaxies, cells, ecosystems, human beings—that have all somehow managed to assemble themselves."

The common argument used to explain this is that, locally, entropy can be lowered by external action, e.g. solar heating action, and that this applies to machines, such as a refrigerator, where the entropy in the cold chamber is being reduced, to growing crystals, and to living organisms. This local increase in order is, however, only possible at the expense of an entropy increase in the surroundings; here more disorder must be created. The conditioner of this statement suffices that living systems are open systems in which both heat, mass, and or work may transfer into or out of the system. Unlike temperature, the putative entropy of a living system would drastically change if the organism were thermodynamically isolated. If an organism was in this type of "isolated" situation, its entropy would increase markedly as the once-living components of the organism decayed to an unrecognizable mass.

== Phase change ==
Owing to these early developments, the typical example of entropy change ΔS is that associated with phase change. In solids, for example, which are typically ordered on the molecular scale, usually have smaller entropy than liquids, and liquids have smaller entropy than gases and colder gases have smaller entropy than hotter gases. Moreover, according to the third law of thermodynamics, at absolute zero temperature, crystalline structures are approximated to have perfect "order" and zero entropy. This correlation occurs because the numbers of different microscopic quantum energy states available to an ordered system are usually much smaller than the number of states available to a system that appears to be disordered.

From his famous 1896 Lectures on Gas Theory, Boltzmann diagrams the structure of a solid body, as shown above, by postulating that each molecule in the body has a "rest position". According to Boltzmann, if it approaches a neighbor molecule it is repelled by it, but if it moves farther away there is an attraction. This, of course was a revolutionary perspective in its time; many, during these years, did not believe in the existence of either atoms or molecules (see: history of the molecule). According to these early views, and others such as those developed by William Thomson, if energy in the form of heat is added to a solid, so to make it into a liquid or a gas, a common depiction is that the ordering of the atoms and molecules becomes more random and chaotic with an increase in temperature:

Thus, according to Boltzmann, owing to increases in thermal motion, whenever heat is added to a working substance, the rest position of molecules will be pushed apart, the body will expand, and this will create more molar-disordered distributions and arrangements of molecules. These disordered arrangements, subsequently, correlate, via probability arguments, to an increase in the measure of entropy.

== Entropy-driven order ==
Entropy has been historically, e.g. by Clausius and Helmholtz, associated with disorder. However, in common speech, order is used to describe organization, structural regularity, or form, like that found in a crystal compared with a gas. This commonplace notion of order is described quantitatively by Landau theory. In Landau theory, the development of order in the everyday sense coincides with the change in the value of a mathematical quantity, a so-called order parameter. An example of an order parameter for crystallization is "bond orientational order" describing the development of preferred directions (the crystallographic axes) in space. For many systems, phases with more structural (e.g. crystalline) order exhibit less entropy than fluid phases under the same thermodynamic conditions. In these cases, labeling phases as ordered or disordered according to the relative amount of entropy (per the Clausius/Helmholtz notion of order/disorder) or via the existence of structural regularity (per the Landau notion of order/disorder) produces matching labels.

However, there is a broad class of systems that manifest entropy-driven order, in which phases with organization or structural regularity, e.g. crystals, have higher entropy than structurally disordered (e.g. fluid) phases under the same thermodynamic conditions. In these systems phases that would be labeled as disordered by virtue of their higher entropy (in the sense of Clausius or Helmholtz) are ordered in both the everyday sense and in Landau theory.

Under suitable thermodynamic conditions, entropy has been predicted or discovered to induce systems to form ordered liquid-crystals, crystals, and quasicrystals. In many systems, directional entropic forces drive this behavior. More recently, it has been shown it is possible to precisely engineer particles for target ordered structures.

== Adiabatic demagnetization ==
In the quest for ultra-cold temperatures, a temperature lowering technique called adiabatic demagnetization is used, where atomic entropy considerations are utilized which can be described in order-disorder terms. In this process, a sample of solid such as chrome-alum salt, whose molecules are equivalent to tiny magnets, is inside an insulated enclosure cooled to a low temperature, typically 2 or 4 kelvins, with a strong magnetic field being applied to the container using a powerful external magnet, so that the tiny molecular magnets are aligned forming a well-ordered "initial" state at that low temperature. This magnetic alignment means that the magnetic energy of each molecule is minimal. The external magnetic field is then reduced, a removal that is considered to be closely reversible. Following this reduction, the atomic magnets then assume random less-ordered orientations, owing to thermal agitations, in the "final" state:

Entropy "order"/"disorder" considerations in the process of adiabatic demagnetization

The "disorder" and hence the entropy associated with the change in the atomic alignments has clearly increased. In terms of energy flow, the movement from a magnetically aligned state requires energy from the thermal motion of the molecules, converting thermal energy into magnetic energy. Yet, according to the second law of thermodynamics, because no heat can enter or leave the container, due to its adiabatic insulation, the system should exhibit no change in entropy, i.e. ΔS = 0. The increase in disorder, however, associated with the randomizing directions of the atomic magnets represents an entropy increase? To compensate for this, the disorder (entropy) associated with the temperature of the specimen must decrease by the same amount. The temperature thus falls as a result of this process of thermal energy being converted into magnetic energy. If the magnetic field is then increased, the temperature rises and the magnetic salt has to be cooled again using a cold material such as liquid helium.

== Difficulties with the term "disorder" ==
In recent years the long-standing use of term "disorder" to discuss entropy has met with some criticism. Critics of the terminology state that entropy is not a measure of 'disorder' or 'chaos', but rather a measure of energy's diffusion or dispersal to more microstates. Shannon's use of the term 'entropy' in information theory refers to the most compressed, or least dispersed, amount of code needed to encompass the content of a signal.

There exists a certain amount of confusion between the terms "entropy" and "Kolmogorov complexity". Simply put, Kolmogorov complexity is the minimum number of bits needed in a computer code to express the state of a particular system completely while entropy refers to a complete collection of possible system configurations and their respective probabilities. Kolmogorov complexity is a measure of disorder, entropy may not be.

For example, a crystal has low entropy - the number of states available to it is relatively small. To describe a particular crystal only requires a small algorithm due to its regularity, (order), so its Kolmogorov complexity is also rather low. On the other hand, a container of gas has very high Kolmogorov complexity: The optimum algorithm might well be simply a list of the states of each individual gas particle. It is very "disordered". However, if these states are fully known, the information entropy and therefore the thermodynamic entropy is zero.

== See also ==
- Entropy
- Entropy production
- Entropy rate
- History of entropy
- Entropy of mixing
- Entropy (information theory)
- Entropy (computing)
- Entropy (energy dispersal)
- Second law of thermodynamics
- Entropy (statistical thermodynamics)
- Entropy (classical thermodynamics)
