= Entropy (statistical thermodynamics) =

Concept

The concept entropy was first developed by German physicist Rudolf Clausius in the mid-nineteenth century as a thermodynamic property that predicts that certain spontaneous processes are irreversible or impossible. In statistical mechanics, entropy is formulated as a statistical property using probability theory. The statistical entropy perspective was introduced in 1870 by Austrian physicist Ludwig Boltzmann, who established a new field of physics that provided the descriptive linkage between the macroscopic observation of nature and the microscopic view based on the rigorous treatment of large ensembles of microscopic states that constitute thermodynamic systems.

== Boltzmann's principle ==
Ludwig Boltzmann defined entropy as a measure of the number of possible microscopic states (microstates) of a system in thermodynamic equilibrium, consistent with its macroscopic thermodynamic properties, which constitute the macrostate of the system. A useful illustration is the example of a sample of gas contained in a container. The easily measurable parameters volume, pressure, and temperature of the gas describe its macroscopic condition (state). At a microscopic level, the gas consists of a vast number of freely moving atoms or molecules, which randomly collide with one another and with the walls of the container. The collisions with the walls produce the macroscopic pressure of the gas, which illustrates the connection between microscopic and macroscopic phenomena.

A microstate of the system is a description of the positions and momenta of all its particles. The large number of particles of the gas provides a near infinite number of possible microstates for the sample, but collectively they exhibit a well-defined average of configuration, which is exhibited as the macrostate of the system, to which each individual microstate contribution is negligibly small. The ensemble of microstates comprises a statistical distribution of probability for each microstate, and the group of most probable configurations accounts for the macroscopic state. Therefore, the system can be described as a whole by only a few macroscopic parameters, called the thermodynamic variables: the total energy E, volume V, pressure P, temperature T, and so forth. However, this description is relatively simple only when the system is in a state of equilibrium.

Equilibrium may be illustrated with a simple example of a drop of food coloring falling into a glass of water. The dye diffuses in a complicated manner, which is difficult to precisely predict. However, after sufficient time has passed, the system reaches a uniform color, a state much easier to describe and explain.

Boltzmann formulated a simple relationship between entropy and the number of possible microstates of a system, which is denoted by the symbol Ω. The entropy S is proportional to the natural logarithm of this number:
$$S = k_\text{B} \ln \Omega$$
The proportionality constant k_{B} is one of the fundamental constants of physics and is named the Boltzmann constant in honor of its discoverer.

Boltzmann's entropy describes the system when all the accessible microstates are equally likely. It is the configuration corresponding to the maximum of entropy at equilibrium. The randomness or disorder is maximal, and so is the lack of distinction (or information) of each microstate.

Entropy is a thermodynamic property just like pressure, volume, or temperature. Therefore, it connects the microscopic and the macroscopic world view.

Boltzmann's principle is regarded as the foundation of statistical mechanics.

== Gibbs entropy formula ==
The macroscopic state of a system is characterized by a distribution on the microstates. The entropy of this distribution is given by the Gibbs entropy formula, named after J. Willard Gibbs. For a classical system (i.e., a collection of classical particles) with a discrete set of microstates, if E_{i} is the energy of microstate i, and p_{i} is the probability that it occurs during the system's fluctuations, then the entropy of the system is
$$S = -k_\text{B}\,\sum_i p_i \ln (p_i)$$

Entropy changes for systems in a canonical state

A system with a well-defined temperature, i.e., one in thermal equilibrium with a thermal reservoir, has a probability of being in a microstate i given by Boltzmann's distribution.

Changes in the entropy caused by changes in the external constraints are then given by:
$$\begin{align}
dS &= -k_\text{B}\,\sum_i dp_i \ln p_i\\
&= -k_\text{B}\,\sum_i dp_i (-E_i/k_\text{B}T -\ln Z)\\
&= \sum_i E_i dp_i / T \\
&= \sum_i [d (E_i p_i) - (dE_i) p_i] / T
\end{align}$$
where we have twice used the conservation of probability, ∑_{i} dp_{i} = 0.

Now, ∑_{i} d(E_{i} p_{i}) is the expectation value of the change in the total energy of the system.

If the changes are sufficiently slow, so that the system remains in the same microscopic state, but the state slowly (and reversibly) changes, then ∑_{i} (dE_{i}) p_{i} is the expectation value of the work done on the system through this reversible process, dW_{rev}.

But from the first law of thermodynamics, dE = δQ + δW. Therefore,
$$dS = \frac{\delta\langle Q_\text{rev} \rangle}{T}$$

In the thermodynamic limit, the fluctuation of the macroscopic quantities from their average values becomes negligible; so this reproduces the definition of entropy from classical thermodynamics, given above.

The quantity $k_\text{B}$ is the Boltzmann constant, a multiplier of the summation expression. The summation is dimensionless, since the value $p_i$ is a probability and therefore dimensionless, and ln is the natural logarithm. Hence the SI unit on both sides of the equation is that of heat capacity:
$$[S] = [k_\text{B}] = \mathrm{\frac {J} {K}}$$

This definition remains meaningful even when the system is far away from equilibrium. Other definitions assume that the system is in thermal equilibrium, either as an isolated system, or as a system in exchange with its surroundings. The set of microstates (with probability distribution) over which the sum is found is called a statistical ensemble. Each type of statistical ensemble (micro-canonical, canonical, grand-canonical, etc.) describes a different configuration of the system's exchanges with the outside, varying from a completely isolated system to a system that can exchange one or more quantities with a reservoir, like energy, volume or molecules. In every ensemble, the equilibrium configuration of the system is dictated by the maximization of the entropy of the union of the system and its reservoir, according to the second law of thermodynamics (see the statistical mechanics article).

Neglecting correlations (or, more generally, statistical dependencies) between the states of individual particles will lead to an incorrect probability distribution on the microstates and hence to an overestimate of the entropy. Such correlations occur in any system with nontrivially interacting particles, that is, in all systems more complex than an ideal gas.

This S is almost universally called simply the entropy. It can also be called the statistical entropy or the thermodynamic entropy without changing the meaning. Note the above expression of the statistical entropy is a discretized version of Shannon entropy. The von Neumann entropy formula is an extension of the Gibbs entropy formula to the quantum-mechanical case.

It has been shown that the Gibbs entropy is equal to the classical "heat engine" entropy characterized by $dS = {\delta Q} / {T}$, and the generalized Boltzmann distribution is a sufficient and necessary condition for this equivalence. Furthermore, the Gibbs entropy is the only entropy measure that is equivalent to the classical "heat engine" entropy under the following postulates:

1. The probability density function is proportional to some function of the ensemble parameters and random variables.
2. Thermodynamic state functions are described by ensemble averages of random variables.
3. In the limit of infinite temperature, all the microstates have the same probability.

=== Ensembles ===
The various ensembles used in statistical thermodynamics are linked to the entropy by the following relations:
$$S = k_\text{B} \ln \Omega_\text{mic} = k_\text{B} (\ln Z_\text{can} + \beta \bar E) = k_\text{B} (\ln \mathcal{Z}_\text{gr} + \beta (\bar E - \mu \bar N))$$

- $\Omega_\text{mic}$ is the microcanonical partition function
- $Z_\text{can}$ is the canonical partition function
- $\mathcal{Z}_\text{gr}$ is the grand canonical partition function

== Order through chaos and the second law of thermodynamics ==
We can think of Ω as a measure of our lack of knowledge about a system. To illustrate this idea, consider a set of 100 coins, each of which is either heads up or tails up. In this example, let us suppose that the macrostates are specified by the total number of heads and tails, while the microstates are specified by the facings of each individual coin (i.e., the exact order in which heads and tails occur). For the macrostates of 100 heads or 100 tails, there is exactly one possible configuration, so our knowledge of the system is complete. At the opposite extreme, the macrostate which gives us the least knowledge about the system consists of 50 heads and 50 tails in any order, for which there are 100891344545564193334812497256 (100 choose 50) ≈ 10^{29} possible microstates.

Even when a system is entirely isolated from external influences, its microstate is constantly changing. For instance, the particles in a gas are constantly moving, and thus occupy a different position at each moment of time; their momenta are also constantly changing as they collide with each other or with the container walls. Suppose we prepare the system in an artificially highly ordered equilibrium state. For instance, imagine dividing a container with a partition and placing a gas on one side of the partition, with a vacuum on the other side. If we remove the partition and watch the subsequent behavior of the gas, we will find that its microstate evolves according to some chaotic and unpredictable pattern, and that on average these microstates will correspond to a more disordered macrostate than before. It is possible, but extremely unlikely, for the gas molecules to bounce off one another in such a way that they remain in one half of the container. It is overwhelmingly probable for the gas to spread out to fill the container evenly, which is the new equilibrium macrostate of the system.

This is an example illustrating the second law of thermodynamics:

the total entropy of any isolated thermodynamic system tends to increase over time, approaching a maximum value.

Since its discovery, this idea has been the focus of a great deal of thought, some of it confused. A chief point of confusion is the fact that the Second Law applies only to isolated systems. For example, the Earth is not an isolated system because it is constantly receiving energy in the form of sunlight. In contrast, the universe may be considered an isolated system, so that its total entropy is constantly increasing. (Needs clarification. See: Second law of thermodynamics#cite note-Grandy 151-21)

== Counting of microstates ==
In classical statistical mechanics, the number of microstates is actually uncountably infinite, since the properties of classical systems are continuous. For example, a microstate of a classical ideal gas is specified by the positions and momenta of all the atoms, which range continuously over the real numbers. If we want to define Ω, we have to come up with a method of grouping the microstates together to obtain a countable set. This procedure is known as coarse graining. In the case of the ideal gas, we count two states of an atom as the "same" state if their positions and momenta are within δx and δp of each other. Since the values of δx and δp can be chosen arbitrarily, the entropy is not uniquely defined. It is defined only up to an additive constant. (As we will see, the thermodynamic definition of entropy is also defined only up to a constant.)

To avoid coarse graining one can take the entropy as defined by the H-theorem.
$$S = -k_\text{B} H_\text{B} := -k_\text{B} \int  f(q_i, p_i) \, \ln f(q_i,p_i) \,dq_1 \, dp_1 \cdots dq_N \, dp_N$$

However, this ambiguity can be resolved with quantum mechanics. The quantum state of a system can be expressed as a superposition of "basis" states, which can be chosen to be energy eigenstates (i.e. eigenstates of the quantum Hamiltonian). Usually, the quantum states are discrete, even though there may be an infinite number of them. For a system with some specified energy E, one takes Ω to be the number of energy eigenstates within a macroscopically small energy range between E and E + δE. In the thermodynamical limit, the specific entropy becomes independent on the choice of δE.

An important result, known as Nernst's theorem or the third law of thermodynamics, states that the entropy of a system at zero absolute temperature is a well-defined constant. This is because a system at zero temperature exists in its lowest-energy state, or ground state, so that its entropy is determined by the degeneracy of the ground state. Many systems, such as crystal lattices, have a unique ground state, and (since ln(1) = 0) this means that they have zero entropy at absolute zero. Other systems have more than one state with the same, lowest energy, and have a non-vanishing "zero-point entropy". For instance, ordinary ice has a zero-point entropy of 3.41 J/(mol⋅K), because its underlying crystal structure possesses multiple configurations with the same energy (a phenomenon known as geometrical frustration).

The third law of thermodynamics states that the entropy of a perfect crystal at absolute zero (0 K) is zero. This means that nearly all molecular motion should cease. The oscillator equation for predicting quantized vibrational levels shows that even when the vibrational quantum number is 0, the molecule still has vibrational energy:
$$E_\nu = h \nu_0 \left(n + \tfrac{1}{2}\right)$$
where $h$ is the Planck constant, $\nu_0$ is the characteristic frequency of the vibration, and $n$ is the vibrational quantum number. Even when $n=0$ (the zero-point energy), $E_n$ does not equal 0, in adherence to the Heisenberg uncertainty principle.

== See also ==
- Boltzmann constant
- Configuration entropy
- Conformational entropy
- Enthalpy
- Entropy
- Entropy (classical thermodynamics)
- Entropy (energy dispersal)
- Entropy of mixing
- Entropy (order and disorder)
- Entropy (information theory)
- History of entropy
- Information theory
- Thermodynamic free energy
- Tsallis entropy
