= Disgregation =

1862 formulation of the concept of entropy

In the history of thermodynamics, disgregation is an early formulation of the concept of entropy. It was defined in 1862 by Rudolf Clausius as the magnitude of the degree in which the molecules of a body are separated from each other. Disgregation was the stepping stone for Clausius to create the mathematical expression for the second law of thermodynamics. Clausius modeled the concept on certain passages in French physicist Sadi Carnot's 1824 paper On the Motive Power of Fire which characterized the transformations of working substances (particles of a thermodynamic system) of an engine cycle, namely "mode of aggregation". The concept was later extended by Clausius in 1865 in the formulation of entropy, and in Ludwig Boltzmann's 1870s developments including the diversities of the motions of the microscopic constituents of matter, described in terms of order and disorder. In 1949, Edward Armand Guggenheim developed the concept of energy dispersal. The terms disgregation and dispersal are near in meaning.

== Historical context ==
In 1824, French physicist Sadi Carnot assumed that heat, like a substance, cannot be diminished in quantity and that it cannot increase. Specifically, he states that in a complete engine cycle "that when a body has experienced any changes, and when after a certain number of transformations it returns to precisely its original state, that is, to that state considered in respect to density, to temperature, to mode of aggregation, let us suppose, I say that this body is found to contain the same quantity of heat that it contained at first, or else that the quantities of heat absorbed or set free in these different transformations are exactly compensated." Furthermore, he states that "this fact has never been called into question" and "to deny this would overthrow the whole theory of heat to which it serves as a basis." This famous sentence, which Carnot spent fifteen years thinking about, marks the start of thermodynamics and signals the slow transition from the older caloric theory to the newer kinetic theory, in which heat is a type of energy in transit.

In 1862, Clausius defined what is now known as entropy or the energetic effects related to irreversibility as the “equivalence-values of transformations” in a thermodynamic cycle. Clausius then signifies the difference between “reversible” (ideal) and “irreversible” (real) processes:

If the cyclical process is reversible, the transformations which occur therein must be partly positive and partly negative, and the equivalence-values of the positive transformations must be together equal to those of the negative transformations, so that the algebraic sum of all the equivalence-values become equal to 0. If the cyclical process is not reversible, the equivalence values of the positive and negative transformations are not necessarily equal, but they can only differ in such a way that the positive transformations predominate.

== Definition ==
In 1862, Clausius labelled the quantity of disgregation with the letter Z, and defined its change as the sum of changes in heat Q and enthalpy H divided by the temperature T of the system:

$$dZ = \frac{dQ+dH}{T}$$

Clausius introduced disgregation in the following passage:

In the cases first mentioned, the arrangements of the molecules is altered. Since, even while a body remains in the same state of aggregation, its molecules do not retain fixed unvarying positions, but are constantly in a state of more of less extended motion, we may, when speaking of the arrangement of the molecules at any particular time, understand either the arrangement which would result from the molecules being fixed in the actual position they occupy at the instant in question, or we may suppose such an arrangement that each molecule occupies its mean position. Now the effect of heat always tends to loosen the connexion between the molecules, and so to increase their mean distances from one another. In order to be able to represent this mathematically, we will express the degree in which the molecules of a body are separated from each other, by introducing a new magnitude, which we will call the disgregation of the body, and by help of which we can define the effect of heat as simply tending to increase the disgregation. The way in which a definite measure of this magnitude can be arrived at will appear from the sequel.

== Equivalence-values of transformations ==
Clausius states what he calls the “theorem respecting the equivalence-values of the transformations” or what is now known as the second law of thermodynamics, as such:

The algebraic sum of all the transformations occurring in a cyclical process can only be positive, or, as an extreme case, equal to nothing.

Quantitatively, Clausius states the mathematical expression for this theorem is as follows. Let dQ be an element of the heat given up by the body to any reservoir of heat during its own changes, heat which it may absorb from a reservoir being here reckoned as negative, and T the absolute temperature of the body at the moment of giving up this heat, then the equation:

$$\int \frac{dQ}{T} = 0$$

must be true for every reversible cyclical process, and the relation:

$$\int \frac{dQ}{T} \ge 0$$

must hold good for every cyclical process which is in any way possible.

== Verbal justification ==
Clausius then points out the inherent difficulty in the mental comprehension of this law by stating: "although the necessity of this theorem admits of strict mathematical proof if we start from the fundamental proposition above quoted, it thereby nevertheless retains an abstract form, in which it is with difficulty embraced by the mind, and we feel compelled to seek for the precise physical cause, of which this theorem is a consequence." The justification for this law, according to Clausius, is based on the following argument:

In all cases in which the heat contained in a body does mechanical work by overcoming resistances, the magnitude of the resistances which it is capable of overcoming is proportional to the absolute temperature.

To elaborate on this, Clausius states that in all cases in which heat can perform mechanical work, these processes always admit to being reduced to the “alteration in some way or another of the arrangement of the constituent parts of the body.” To exemplify this, Clausius moves into a discussion of change of state of a body, i.e. solid, liquid, gas. For instance, he states, “when bodies are expanded by heat, their molecules being thus separated from each other: in this case the mutual attractions of the molecules on the one hand, and external opposing forces on the other, insofar as any such are in operation, have to be overcome. Again, the state of aggregation of bodies is altered by heat, solid bodies rendered liquid, and both solid and liquid bodies being rendered aeriform: here likewise internal forces, and in general external forces also, have to be overcome.”

== Ice melting ==
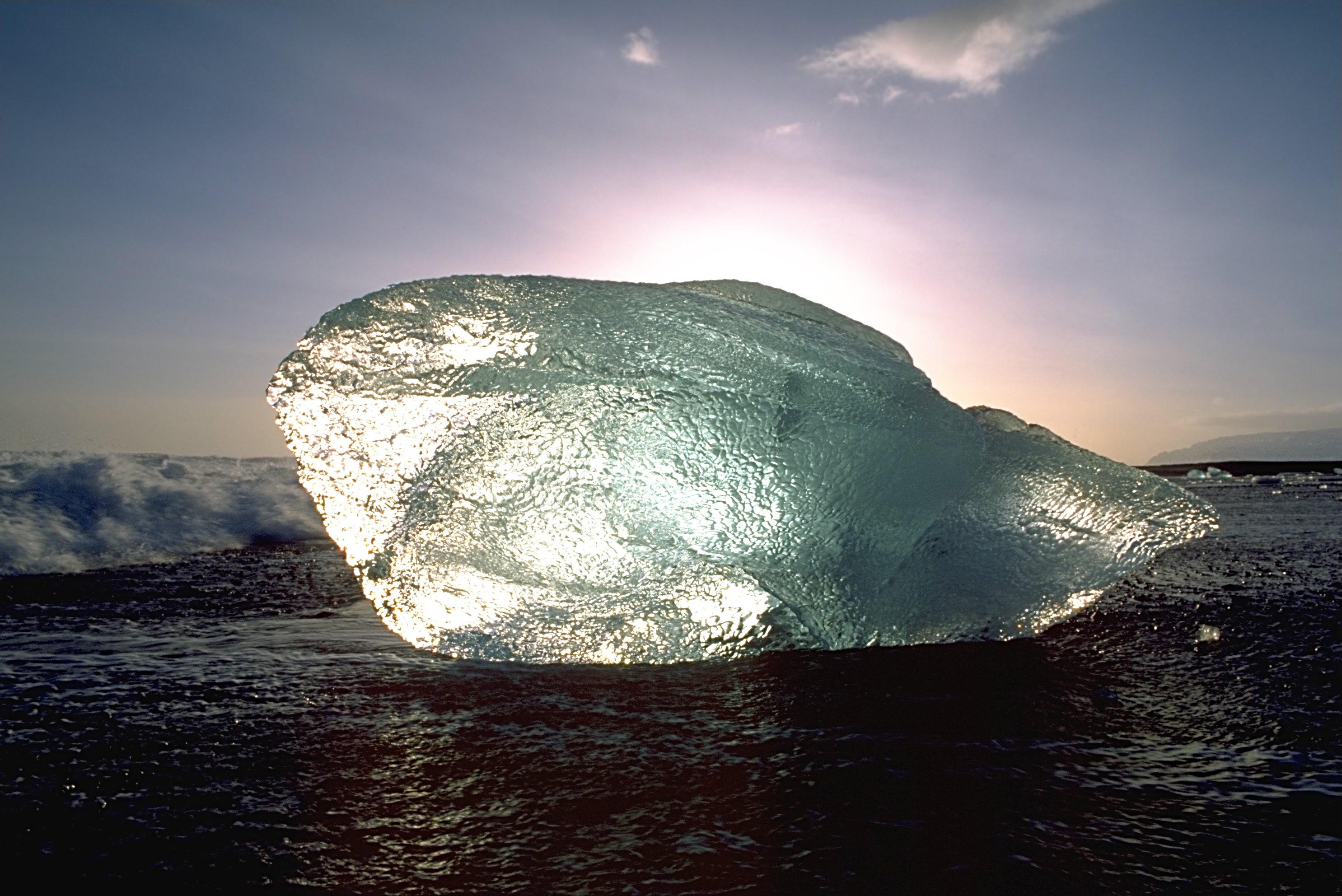
Ice melting on a beach in Iceland

Clausius discusses the example of the melting of ice, a classic example which is used in almost all chemistry books to this day, and explains a representation of the mechanical equivalent of work related to this energetic change mathematically:

The forces exerted upon one another by the molecules are not of so simple a kind that each molecule can be replaced by a mere point; for many cases occur in which it can be easily seen that we have not merely to consider the distances of the molecules, but also their relative positions. If we take, for example, the melting of ice, there is no doubt that interior forces, exerted by the molecules upon each other, are overcome, and accordingly increase of disgregation takes place; nevertheless the centers of gravity of the molecules are on the average not so far removed from each other in the liquid water as they were in the ice, for the water is the denser of the two. Again, the peculiar behaviour of water in contracting when heated above 0°C., and only beginning to expand when its temperature exceeds 4°, shows that likewise in liquid water, in the neighbourhood of its melting-point, increase of disgregation is not accompanied by increase of the mean distances of its molecules.

== Measurement ==
As it is difficult to obtain direct measures of the interior forces that the molecules of the body exert on each other, Clausius states that an indirect way to obtain quantitative measures of what is now called entropy is to calculate the work done in overcoming internal forces:

In the case of the interior forces, it would accordingly be difficult—even if we did not want to measure them, but only to represent them mathematically—to find a fitting expression for them which would admit of a simple determination of the magnitude. This difficulty, however, disappears if we take into calculation, not the forces themselves, but the mechanical work which, in any change of arrangement, is required to overcome them. The expressions for the quantities of work are simpler than those for the corresponding forces; for the quantities of work can be all expressed, without further secondary statements, by the numbers which, having reference to the same unit, can be added together, or subtracted from one another, however various the forces may be to which they refer.

It is therefore convenient to alter the form of the above law by introducing, instead of the forces themselves, the work done in overcoming them. In this form it reads as follows:

The mechanical work which can be done by heat during any change of the arrangement of a body is proportional to the absolute temperature at which this change occurs.

== See also ==
- Entropy (energy dispersal)
