= Frank L. Lambert =

American chemist

- Born: July 10, 1918; Minneapolis, Minnesota, U.S.
- Died: December 28, 2018 (aged 100); La Verne, California, U.S.
- Education: Harvard University; University of Chicago
- Known for: Advocacy for teaching of entropy as energy dispersal
- Scientific career
- Fields: Chemistry
- Workplaces: Occidental College; Getty Conservation Institute

Frank L. Lambert (July 10, 1918 – December 28, 2018) was an American academic who was Professor Emeritus of Chemistry at Occidental College, Los Angeles. He is known for his advocacy of changing the definition of thermodynamic entropy as "disorder" in US general chemistry texts to its replacement by viewing entropy as a measure of energy dispersal. He died in December 2018 at the age of 100.

== Teaching career ==
Lambert graduated with honors from Harvard University with an AB, and received his doctorate (PhD) from the University of Chicago. After serving in the US Army in WWII and working briefly in industrial research and development, Lambert joined the faculty of Occidental College, teaching from 1948 to 1981.

Lambert's primary concern was teaching. He advocated the abandonment of the standard lecture system, opting instead for a system more akin to a partnership with his students. Additionally, his research in the synthesis and polarography of organic halogen compounds was designed for undergraduate collaboration and all but one of his articles were published with student co-authors.

After retiring from teaching in 1981, Lambert as a Professor emeritus, became the scientific advisor to the J. Paul Getty Museum, and then the principal Aide to the Scientific Research Director when the Getty Conservation Institute was established.

== Technical writings ==
Lambert is known for his work on the energy dispersal model of entropy, publishing articles in the American Chemical Society's Journal of Chemical Education. After his initial 1999 article, "Shuffled Cards, Messy Desks, and Disorderly Dorm Rooms – Examples of Entropy Increase? Nonsense!", a second article completed his critique of the inadequacy of describing entropy in terms of "disorder". Then, in 2002 "Entropy Is Simple, Qualitatively" described the spontaneous increase in entropy as fundamentally due to the tendency of all types of energy to disperse in space, if they are not constrained – with molecular motion and energy content as the most important in chemistry. Further publications by Lambert and colleagues on the subject appeared through 2011. In 2004, Science noted the emphases of his articles and listed his major website. His ideas have been used by other authors in the Journal of Chemical Education. Lambert's ideas on entropy have been examined in a broad review of entropy by Jesper Haglund, Fredrik Jeppsson and Helge Strömdahl.

Most notably, his work has influenced the way in which entropy (a concept defined mathematically in the technical literature) is presented in introductory textbooks and in popular science writing. Margulis and Eduard Punset have suggested that "The work of Frank Lambert, integrated into virtually all recent chemistry textbooks, makes clear that the second law is really a matter of energy dispersal." In 1999 most general chemistry texts described entropy as disorder. Since then many have shifted their emphasis to that of energy dispersal. Lambert has extensively documented the way 29 textbooks have changed in this respect up to 2012. While authors often do not acknowledge the source for changes that they make from one edition to the next, some authors have acknowledged Lambert's influence. The 2005 2nd Edition of "Chemistry: The Molecular Science" by Moore et al., on p. xiv states "Revised Chapters 14 and 18 to more clearly present entropy as dispersal of energy (See Lambert F. L. J. Chem. Educ. 1999,76, 1385; 2002, 79, 187)." The 2006 4th edition of "Chemistry: The Molecular Nature of Matter and Change" by Silberberg on p. xviii states "Chapter 20 has been completely rewritten to reflect a new approach to the coverage of entropy. The vague notion of "disorder" (with analogies to macroscopic systems) has been replaced with the idea that entropy is related to the dispersal of a system's energy and the freedom of motion of its particles." Silberberg thanks "Frank Lambert of Occidental College for insightful advice and comments on the coverage of entropy". In his "Chemistry: A Molecular Approach", Tro states on p. xxi "Thanks also to Frank Lambert for helping us all to think more clearly about entropy and his review of the entropy sections of this book." His ideas were independently put forward in the context of physics, rather than chemistry, by Harvey Leff, who also treated entropy as a measure of the spreading of energy. In 2012, Leff wrote a detailed five-part series for physics instructors treating entropy as the spreading of energy. Joshua Floyd, an engineer, has used Lambert's ideas to critique the use of the second law of thermodynamics in futures studies and to criticize the application of the second law in general to areas not involving the physical sciences.
