= Entropy (classical thermodynamics) =

Measure of disorder within thermodynamic systems

Pressure	Volume
(Stress)	(Strain)
Temperature	Entropy
Chemical potential	Particle number

In classical thermodynamics, entropy (from Greek τρoπή (tropḗ) 'transformation') is a property of a thermodynamic system that expresses the direction or outcome of spontaneous changes in the system. The term was introduced by Rudolf Clausius in the mid-19th century to explain the relationship of the internal energy that is available or unavailable for transformations in form of heat and work. Entropy predicts that certain processes are irreversible or impossible, despite not violating the conservation of energy. The definition of entropy is central to the establishment of the second law of thermodynamics, which states that the entropy of isolated systems cannot decrease with time, as they always tend to arrive at a state of thermodynamic equilibrium, where the entropy is highest. Entropy is therefore also considered to be a measure of disorder in the system.

Ludwig Boltzmann explained the entropy as a measure of the number of possible microscopic configurations Ω of the individual atoms and molecules of the system (microstates) which correspond to the macroscopic state (macrostate) of the system. He showed that the thermodynamic entropy is k ln Ω, where the factor k has since been known as the Boltzmann constant.

== Concept ==
Figure 1. A thermodynamic model system

Differences in pressure, density, and temperature of a thermodynamic system tend to equalize over time. For example, in a room containing a glass of melting ice, the difference in temperature between the warm room and the cold glass of ice and water is equalized by energy flowing as heat from the room to the cooler ice and water mixture. Over time, the temperature of the glass and its contents and the temperature of the room achieve a balance. The entropy of the room has decreased. However, the entropy of the glass of ice and water has increased more than the entropy of the room has decreased. In an isolated system, such as the room and ice water taken together, the dispersal of energy from warmer to cooler regions always results in a net increase in entropy. Thus, when the system of the room and ice water system has reached thermal equilibrium, the entropy change from the initial state is at its maximum. The entropy of the thermodynamic system is a measure of the progress of the equalization.

Many irreversible processes result in an increase of entropy. One of them is mixing of two or more different substances, occasioned by bringing them together by removing a wall that separates them, keeping the temperature and pressure constant. The mixing is accompanied by the entropy of mixing. In the important case of mixing of ideal gases, the combined system does not change its internal energy by work or heat transfer; the entropy increase is then entirely due to the spreading of the different substances into their new common volume.

From a macroscopic perspective, in classical thermodynamics, the entropy is a state function of a thermodynamic system: that is, a property depending only on the current state of the system, independent of how that state came to be achieved. Entropy is a key ingredient of the Second law of thermodynamics, which has important consequences e.g. for the performance of heat engines, refrigerators, and heat pumps.

== Definition ==
According to the Clausius equality, for a closed homogeneous system, in which only reversible processes take place,

$$\oint \frac{\delta Q}{T}=0.$$

With $T$ being the uniform temperature of the closed system and $\delta Q$ the incremental reversible transfer of heat energy into that system.

That means the line integral $\int_L \frac{\delta Q}{T}$ is path-independent.

A state function $S$, called entropy, may be defined which satisfies

$$\mathrm{d}S = \frac{\delta Q}{T}.$$

== Entropy measurement ==
The thermodynamic state of a uniform closed system is determined by its temperature T and pressure P. A change in entropy can be written as

$$\mathrm{d}S=\left(\frac{\partial S}{\partial T}\right)_P\mathrm{d}T+\left(\frac{\partial S}{\partial P}\right)_T\mathrm{d}P.$$

The first contribution depends on the heat capacity at constant pressure C_{P} through

$$\left(\frac{\partial S}{\partial T}\right)_P=\frac {C_P}{T}.$$

This is the result of the definition of the heat capacity by δQ = C_{P} dT and T dS = δQ. The second term may be rewritten with one of the Maxwell relations

$$\left(\frac{\partial S}{\partial P}\right)_T=-\left(\frac{\partial V}{\partial T}\right)_P$$

and the definition of the volumetric thermal-expansion coefficient

$$\alpha_V=\frac{1}{V}\left(\frac{\partial V}{\partial T}\right)_P$$

so that

$$\mathrm{d}S=\frac {C_P}{T}\mathrm{d}T-\alpha_V V\mathrm{d}P.$$

With this expression the entropy S at arbitrary P and T can be related to the entropy S_{0} at some reference state at P_{0} and T_{0} according to

$$S(P,T)=S(P_0,T_0)+\int_{T_0}^T \frac {C_P(P_0,T^\prime)}{T^\prime}\mathrm{d}T^\prime-\int_{P_0}^P \alpha_V(P^\prime ,T) V(P^\prime ,T)\mathrm{d}P^\prime.$$

In classical thermodynamics, the entropy of the reference state can be put equal to zero at any convenient temperature and pressure. For example, for pure substances, one can take the entropy of the solid at the melting point at 1 bar equal to zero. From a more fundamental point of view, the third law of thermodynamics suggests that there is a preference to take S = 0 at T = 0 (absolute zero) for perfectly ordered materials such as crystals.

S(P, T) is determined by followed a specific path in the P-T diagram: integration over T at constant pressure P_{0}, so that dP = 0, and in the second integral one integrates over P at constant temperature T, so that dT = 0. As the entropy is a function of state the result is independent of the path.

The above relation shows that the determination of the entropy requires knowledge of the heat capacity and the equation of state (which is the relation between P,V, and T of the substance involved). Normally these are complicated functions and numerical integration is needed. In simple cases it is possible to get analytical expressions for the entropy. In the case of an ideal gas, the heat capacity is constant and the ideal gas law PV = nRT gives that α_{V}V = V/T = nR/p, with n the number of moles and R the molar ideal-gas constant. So, the molar entropy of an ideal gas is given by

$$S_m(P,T)=S_m(P_0,T_0)+C_P \ln \frac {T}{T_0}-R\ln\frac{P}{P_0}.$$

In this expression C_{P} now is the molar heat capacity.

The entropy of inhomogeneous systems is the sum of the entropies of the various subsystems. The laws of thermodynamics hold rigorously for inhomogeneous systems even though they may be far from internal equilibrium. The only condition is that the thermodynamic parameters of the composing subsystems are (reasonably) well-defined.

== Temperature-entropy diagrams ==
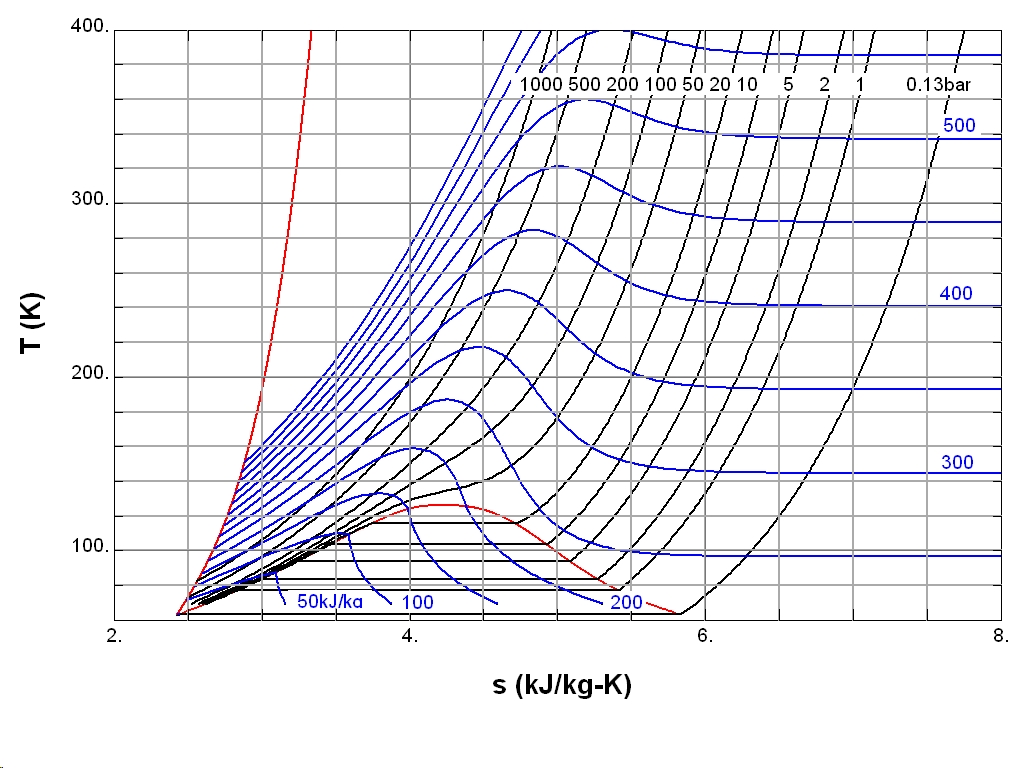
Fig.2 Temperature–entropy diagram of nitrogen. The red curve at the left is the melting curve. The red dome represents the two-phase region with the low-entropy side the saturated liquid and the high-entropy side the saturated gas. The black curves give the TS relation along isobars. The pressures are indicated in bar. The blue curves are isenthalps (curves of constant enthalpy). The values are indicated in blue in kJ/kg.

Entropy values of important substances may be obtained from reference works or with commercial software in tabular form or as diagrams. One of the most common diagrams is the temperature-entropy diagram (TS-diagram). For example, Fig.2 shows the TS-diagram of nitrogen, depicting the melting curve and saturated liquid and vapor values with isobars and isenthalps.

== Entropy change in irreversible transformations ==
We now consider inhomogeneous systems in which internal transformations (processes) can take place. If we calculate the entropy S_{1} before and S_{2} after such an internal process the Second Law of Thermodynamics demands that S_{2} ≥ S_{1} where the equality sign holds if the process is reversible. The difference S_{i} = S_{2} − S_{1} is the entropy production due to the irreversible process. The Second law demands that the entropy of an isolated system cannot decrease.

Suppose a system is thermally and mechanically isolated from the environment (isolated system). For example, consider an insulating rigid box divided by a movable partition into two volumes, each filled with gas. If the pressure of one gas is higher, it will expand by moving the partition, thus performing work on the other gas. Also, if the gases are at different temperatures, heat can flow from one gas to the other provided the partition allows heat conduction. Our above result indicates that the entropy of the system as a whole will increase during these processes. There exists a maximum amount of entropy the system may possess under the circumstances. This entropy corresponds to a state of stable equilibrium, since a transformation to any other equilibrium state would cause the entropy to decrease, which is forbidden. Once the system reaches this maximum-entropy state, no part of the system can perform work on any other part. It is in this sense that entropy is a measure of the energy in a system that cannot be used to do work.

An irreversible process degrades the performance of a thermodynamic system, designed to do work or produce cooling, and results in entropy production. The entropy generation during a reversible process is zero. Thus entropy production is a measure of the irreversibility and may be used to compare engineering processes and machines.

== Thermal machines ==
Figure 3: Heat engine diagram. The system, discussed in the text, is indicated by the dotted rectangle. It contains the two reservoirs and the heat engine. The arrows define the positive directions of the flows of heat and work.

Clausius' identification of S as a significant quantity was motivated by the study of reversible and irreversible thermodynamic transformations. A heat engine is a thermodynamic system that can undergo a sequence of transformations which ultimately return it to its original state. Such a sequence is called a cyclic process, or simply a cycle. During some transformations, the engine may exchange energy with its environment. The net result of a cycle is

1. mechanical work done by the system (which can be positive or negative, the latter meaning that work is done on the engine),
2. heat transferred from one part of the environment to another. In the steady state, by the conservation of energy, the net energy lost by the environment is equal to the work done by the engine.

If every transformation in the cycle is reversible, the cycle is reversible, and it can be run in reverse, so that the heat transfers occur in the opposite directions and the amount of work done switches sign.

=== Heat engines ===
Consider a heat engine working between two temperatures T_{H} and T_{a}. With T_{a} we have ambient temperature in mind, but, in principle it may also be some other low temperature. The heat engine is in thermal contact with two heat reservoirs which are supposed to have a very large heat capacity so that their temperatures do not change significantly if heat Q_{H} is removed from the hot reservoir and Q_{a} is added to the lower reservoir. Under normal operation T_{H} > T_{a} and Q_{H}, Q_{a}, and W are all positive.

As our thermodynamical system we take a big system which includes the engine and the two reservoirs. It is indicated in Fig.3 by the dotted rectangle. It is inhomogeneous, closed (no exchange of matter with its surroundings), and adiabatic (no exchange of heat with its surroundings). It is not isolated since per cycle a certain amount of work W is produced by the system given by the first law of thermodynamics

$$W = Q_H - Q_a.$$

We used the fact that the engine itself is periodic, so its internal energy has not changed after one cycle. The same is true for its entropy, so the entropy increase S_{2} − S_{1} of our system after one cycle is given by the reduction of entropy of the hot source and the increase of the cold sink. The entropy increase of the total system S_{2} - S_{1} is equal to the entropy production S_{i} due to irreversible processes in the engine so

$$S_i =  -\frac{Q_H}{T_H} + \frac{Q_a}{T_a}.$$

The Second law demands that S_{i} ≥ 0. Eliminating Q_{a} from the two relations gives

$$W = \left(1 - \frac{T_a}{T_H}\right)Q_H - T_a S_i.$$

The first term is the maximum possible work for a heat engine, given by a reversible engine, as one operating along a Carnot cycle. Finally

$$W = W_\text{max} - T_a S_i.$$

This equation tells us that the production of work is reduced by the generation of entropy. The term T_{a}S_{i} gives the lost work, or dissipated energy, by the machine.

Correspondingly, the amount of heat, discarded to the cold sink, is increased by the entropy generation

$$Q_a = \frac{T_a}{T_H}Q_H + T_a S_i = Q_{a,\text{min}} + T_a S_i.$$

These important relations can also be obtained without the inclusion of the heat reservoirs. See the article on entropy production.

=== Refrigerators ===
The same principle can be applied to a refrigerator working between a low temperature T_{L} and ambient temperature. The schematic drawing is exactly the same as Fig.3 with T_{H} replaced by T_{L}, Q_{H} by Q_{L}, and the sign of W reversed. In this case the entropy production is

$$S_i = \frac{Q_a}{T_a} - \frac{Q_L}{T_L}$$

and the work needed to extract heat Q_{L} from the cold source is

$$W = Q_L\left(\frac{T_a}{T_L} - 1\right) + T_a S_i.$$

The first term is the minimum required work, which corresponds to a reversible refrigerator, so we have

$$W = W_\text{min} + T_a S_i$$

i.e., the refrigerator compressor has to perform extra work to compensate for the dissipated energy due to irreversible processes which lead to entropy production.

== See also ==
- Entropy
- Enthalpy
- Entropy production
- Fundamental thermodynamic relation
- Thermodynamic free energy
- History of entropy
- Entropy (statistical views)
