= Perfect crystal =

Crystal without defects

Crystalline materials (mainly metals and alloys, but also stoichiometric salts and other materials) are made up of solid regions of ordered matter (atoms placed in one of a number of ordered formations called Bravais lattices). These regions are known as crystals. A perfect crystal is a crystal that contains no point, line, or planar defects. There are a wide variety of crystallographic defects.

The hypothetical concept of a perfect crystal is important in the basic formulation of the third law of thermodynamics.

In crystallography, the phrase "perfect crystal" can be used to mean "no linear or planar imperfections", as it is difficult to measure small quantities of point imperfections in an otherwise defect-free crystal.

Imperfections are created by various thermodynamic processes.
