= Nernst heat theorem =

Early 20th century thermochemistry theory

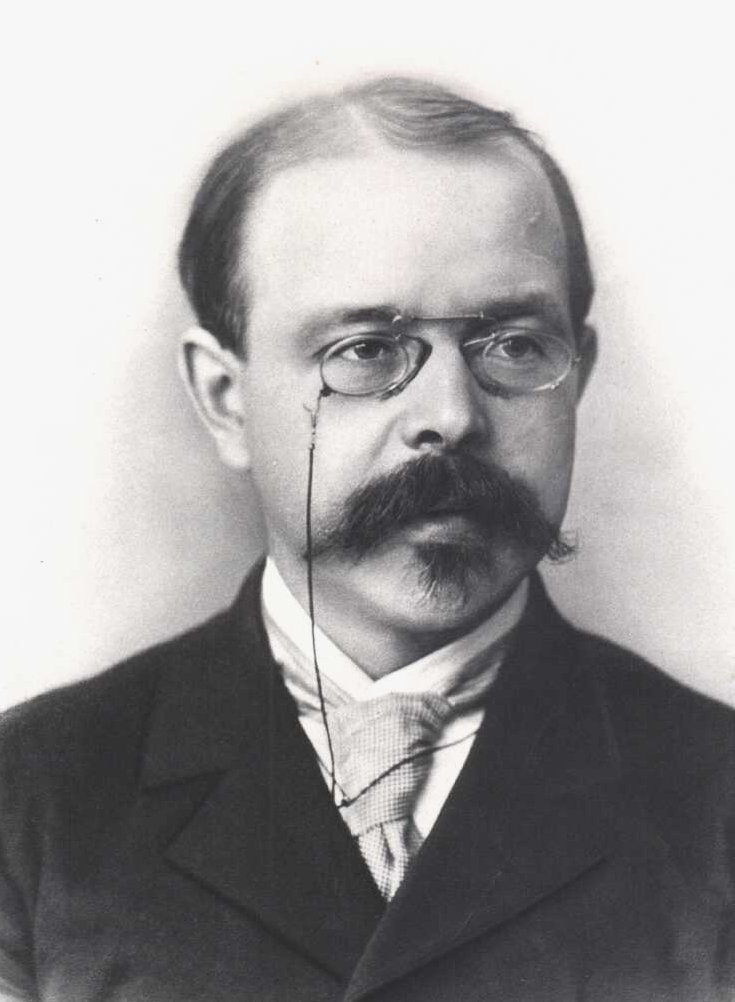
Walther Nernst

The Nernst heat theorem was formulated by Walther Nernst early in the twentieth century and was used in the development of the third law of thermodynamics.

== The theorem ==
The Nernst heat theorem says that as absolute zero is approached, the entropy change ΔS for a chemical or physical transformation approaches 0. This can be expressed mathematically as follows:

$$\lim_{T \to 0} \Delta S = 0$$

The above equation is a modern statement of the theorem. Nernst often used a form that avoided the concept of entropy.

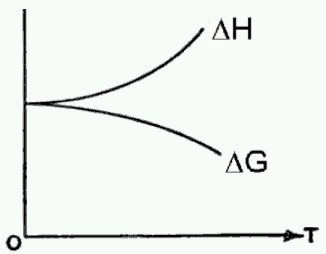
Enthalpy and free energy both have a slope of zero and become equal as temperature approaches absolute zero

Another way of looking at the theorem is to start with the definition of the Gibbs free energy (G), $G = H-TS$, where H stands for enthalpy. For a change from reactants to products at constant temperature and pressure the equation becomes $\Delta G = \Delta H - T\Delta S$.

In the limit of T = 0 the equation reduces to just ΔG = ΔH, as illustrated in the figure shown here, which is supported by experimental data. However, it is known from thermodynamics that the slope of the ΔG curve is −ΔS. Since the slope shown here reaches the horizontal limit of 0 as T → 0 then the implication is that ΔS → 0, which is the Nernst heat theorem.

The significance of the Nernst heat theorem is that it was later used by Max Planck to give the third law of thermodynamics, which is that the entropy of all pure, perfectly crystalline homogeneous materials in complete internal equilibrium is 0 at absolute zero.

== See also ==
- Theodore William Richards
