= Edward A. Guggenheim =

English chemist (1901 - 1970)

Edward Guggenheim
- Guggenheim in 1946
- Born: Edward Armand Guggenheim; 11 August 1901; Manchester, England
- Died: 9 August 1970 (aged 68); Reading, Berkshire, England
- Education: Gonville and Caius College, Cambridge
- Awards: Fellow of the Royal Society (1946)
- Scientific career
- Fields: Chemical thermodynamics
- Workplaces: University of Reading; University of Cambridge; Stanford University; University College London; Imperial College London; Montreal Laboratory for Atomic Energy

Edward Armand Guggenheim FRS (11 August 1901 – 9 August 1970) was an English physical chemist, noted for his contributions to thermodynamics.

== Life ==
Guggenheim was born in Manchester 11 August 1901, the son of Armand Guggenheim and Marguerite Bertha Simon. His father was Swiss of Jewish origin, a naturalised British citizen. Guggenheim married Simone Ganzin (died 1954), in 1934 and Ruth Helen Aitkin, born Clarke, widow, in 1955. They had no children. He died in Reading, Berkshire 9 August 1970.

== Education ==
Guggenheim was educated at Terra Nova School, Southport, Charterhouse School and Gonville and Caius College, Cambridge, where he obtained firsts in both the mathematics part 1 and chemistry part 2 triposes. Unable to gain a fellowship at the college, he went to Denmark where he studied under J. N. Brønsted at the University of Copenhagen.

== Career ==
Returning to England, he found a place at University College, London where he wrote his first book, Modern Thermodynamics by the Methods of Willard Gibbs (1933), which "established his reputation and revolutionized the teaching of the subject". He was also a visiting professor of chemistry at Stanford University, and later became a reader in the chemical engineering department at Imperial College London. During World War II he worked on defence matters for the navy. In 1946 he was appointed professor of chemistry and head of department at Reading University, where he stayed until his retirement in 1966.

== Publications ==
Guggenheim produced eleven books and more than 100 papers. His first book,Modern Thermodynamics by the Methods of Willard Gibbs (1933), was a 206-page, detailed study, with text, figures, index, and preface by F. G. Donnan, showing how the analytical thermodynamic methods developed by Willard Gibbs leads in a straightforward manner to relations such as phases, constants, solution, systems, and laws, that are unambiguous and exact. This book, together with Gilbert N. Lewis and Merle Randall's 1923 textbook Thermodynamics and the Free Energy of Chemical Substances, are said to be responsible for the inception of the modern science of chemical thermodynamics.

Other books included Statistical Thermodynamics with Ralph Fowler (1939), and Thermodynamics – an Advanced Treatment for Chemists and Physicists . In the preface to this book, he states that no thermodynamics book written before 1929 even attempts an account of any of the following matters:

1. The modern definition of heat given by Max Born in 1921.
2. The quantal theory of the entropy of gases and its experimental verification.
3. Peter Debye's formulae for the activity coefficients of electrolytes.
4. The use of electrochemical potentials of ions
5. The application of thermodynamics to dielectrics and to paramagnetic substances.

== Honours and awards ==
Guggenheim was elected a Fellow of the Royal Society in 1946. His nomination reads

Distinguished for his important contributions to thermodynamics and statistical mechanics, and for the applications of these branches of physical science in many fields, e.g. electrolytic solutions, electro-chemical potentials, magnetic and electrostatic energy, surface and interfacial phenomena, stellar interiors, chemical equilibria and reaction kinetics, co-operative assemblies, theory of super-lattices, etc. Author of "Modern Thermodynamics by the Methods of Willard Gibbs" (1933). Joint author with Professor R. H. Fowler of "Statistical Thermodynamics" (1939).

In 1972, the E. A. Guggenheim Memorial Fund was established by friends and colleagues. The income from the fund is used to (a) award an annual prize and (b) to provide a biennial or triennial memorial lecture on some topic of chemistry or physics appropriate to the interests of Guggenheim.

The Guggenheim Medal was introduced in 2014 by the Institution of Chemical Engineers for significant contributions to research in thermodynamics and / or complex fluids. The first recipient (in 2015) was Professor George Jackson of Imperial College London.

== See also ==
- Guggenheim scheme
- Stavermann–Guggenheim equation
- Bromley equation
- Entropy (energy dispersal)
- Non-random two-liquid model
- Specific ion interaction theory
- Thermodynamic activity
