= Absolute zero =

Lowest theoretical temperature

Zero kelvin (−273.15 °C) is defined as absolute zero.

Absolute zero is the theoretically coldest temperature, a state at which a system's internal energy, and in ideal cases entropy, reach their minimum values. The Kelvin scale is defined so that absolute zero is 0 Kelvin, equivalent to −273.15 °C on the Celsius scale, and −459.67 °F on the Fahrenheit scale. The Kelvin and Rankine temperature scales set their zero points at absolute zero by definition. This limit can be estimated by extrapolating the ideal gas law to the temperature at which the volume or pressure of a classical gas becomes zero.

Although absolute zero can be approached, it cannot be reached. Some isentropic processes, such as adiabatic expansion, can lower the system's temperature without relying on a colder medium. Nevertheless, the third law of thermodynamics implies that no physical process can reach absolute zero in a finite number of steps. As a system nears this limit, further reductions in temperature become increasingly difficult, regardless of the cooling method used. In 2018, scientists at the University of Bremen achieved temperatures as low as 38 picokelvin (pK), 38 trillionths of a degree above absolute zero. At these low temperatures, matter displays exotic quantum mechanical phenomena such as superconductivity, superfluidity, and Bose–Einstein condensation. The particles still exhibit zero-point energy motion, as mandated by the Heisenberg uncertainty principle and, for a system of fermions, the Pauli exclusion principle.

== Ideal gas laws ==
Pressure–temperature plots for three different gas samples, measured at constant volume, all extrapolate to zero at the same point, the absolute zero.

For an ideal gas, the pressure at constant volume decreases linearly with temperature, and the volume at constant pressure also decreases linearly with temperature. When these relationships are expressed using the Celsius scale, both pressure and volume extrapolate to zero at approximately −273.15 °C. This implies the existence of a lower bound on temperature, beyond which the gas would have negative pressure or volume—an unphysical result.

To resolve this, the concept of absolute temperature is introduced, with 0 kelvins defined as the point at which pressure or volume would vanish in an ideal gas. This temperature corresponds to −273.15 °C, and is referred to as absolute zero. The ideal gas law is therefore formulated in terms of absolute temperature to remain consistent with observed gas behavior and physical limits.

== Absolute temperature scales ==
Absolute temperature is conventionally measured on the Kelvin scale (using Celsius-scaled increments) and, more rarely, on the Rankine scale (using Fahrenheit-scaled increments). Absolute temperature measurement is uniquely determined by a multiplicative constant which specifies the size of the degree, so the ratios of two absolute temperatures, T_{2}/T_{1}, are the same in all scales.

Absolute temperature also emerges naturally in statistical mechanics. In the Maxwell–Boltzmann, Fermi–Dirac, and Bose–Einstein distributions, absolute temperature appears in the exponential factor that determines how particles populate energy states. Specifically, the relative number of particles at a given energy E depends exponentially on E/kT, where k is the Boltzmann constant and T is the absolute temperature.

== Unattainability of absolute zero ==
Left side: Absolute zero could be reached in a finite number of steps if S(0, X_{1}) ≠ S(0, X_{2}). Right: An infinite number of steps is needed since S(0, X_{1}) = S(0, X_{2}). Here, X is some controllable parameter of the system, such as its volume or pressure.

The third law of thermodynamics concerns the behavior of entropy as temperature approaches absolute zero. It states that the entropy of a system approaches a constant minimum at 0 K. For a perfect crystal, this minimum is taken to be zero, since the system would be in a state of perfect order with only one microstate available. In some systems, there may be more than one microstate at minimum energy and there is some residual entropy at 0 K.

Several other formulations of the third law exist. Nernst heat theorem holds that the change in entropy for any constant-temperature process tends to zero as the temperature approaches zero. A key consequence is that absolute zero cannot be reached, since removing heat becomes increasingly inefficient and entropy changes vanish. This unattainability principle means no physical process can cool a system to absolute zero in a finite number of steps or finite time.

== Thermal properties at low temperatures ==
Using the Debye model, the specific heat and entropy of a pure crystal are proportional to T^{3}, while the enthalpy and chemical potential are proportional to T^{4} (Guggenheim, p. 111). These quantities drop toward their T = 0 limiting values and approach with zero slopes. For the specific heats at least, the limiting value itself is definitely zero, as borne out by experiments to below 10 K. Even the less detailed Einstein model shows this curious drop in specific heats. In fact, all specific heats vanish at absolute zero, not just those of crystals. Likewise for the coefficient of thermal expansion. Maxwell's relations show that various other quantities also vanish. These phenomena were unanticipated.

One model that estimates the properties of an electron gas at absolute zero in metals is the Fermi gas. The electrons, being fermions, must be in different quantum states, which leads the electrons to get very high typical velocities, even at absolute zero. The maximum energy that electrons can have at absolute zero is called the Fermi energy. The Fermi temperature is defined as this maximum energy divided by the Boltzmann constant, and is on the order of 80,000 K for typical electron densities found in metals. For temperatures significantly below the Fermi temperature, the electrons behave in almost the same way as at absolute zero. This explains the failure of the classical equipartition theorem for metals that eluded classical physicists in the late 19th century.

=== Gibbs free energy ===
Since the relation between changes in Gibbs free energy (G), the enthalpy (H) and the entropy is

$$\Delta G = \Delta H - T \Delta S \,$$

thus, as T decreases, ΔG and ΔH approach each other (so long as ΔS is bounded). Experimentally, it is found that all spontaneous processes (including chemical reactions) result in a decrease in G as they proceed toward equilibrium. If ΔS and/or T are small, the condition ΔG < 0 may imply that ΔH < 0, which would indicate an exothermic reaction. However, this is not required; endothermic reactions can proceed spontaneously if the TΔS term is large enough.

Moreover, the slopes of the derivatives of ΔG and ΔH converge and are equal to zero at T = 0. This ensures that ΔG and ΔH are nearly the same over a considerable range of temperatures and justifies the approximate empirical Principle of Thomsen and Berthelot, which states that the equilibrium state to which a system proceeds is the one that evolves the greatest amount of heat, i.e., an actual process is the most exothermic one (Callen, pp. 186–187).

== Zero-point energy ==
Probability densities and energies (indicated by an offset) of the four lowest energy eigenstates of a quantum harmonic oscillator. ZPE denotes the zero-point energy.

Even at absolute zero, a quantum system retains a minimum amount of energy due to the Heisenberg uncertainty principle, which prevents particles from having both perfectly defined position and momentum. This residual energy is known as zero-point energy. In the case of the quantum harmonic oscillator, a standard model for vibrations in atoms and molecules, the uncertainty in a particle's momentum implies it must retain some kinetic energy, while the uncertainty in its position contributes to potential energy. As a result, such a system has a nonzero energy at absolute zero.

Zero-point energy helps explain certain physical phenomena. For example, liquid helium does not solidify at normal pressure, even at temperatures near absolute zero. The large zero-point motion of helium atoms, caused by their low mass and weak interatomic forces, prevents them from settling into a solid structure. Only under high pressure does helium solidify, as the atoms are forced closer together and the interatomic forces grow stronger.

== History ==
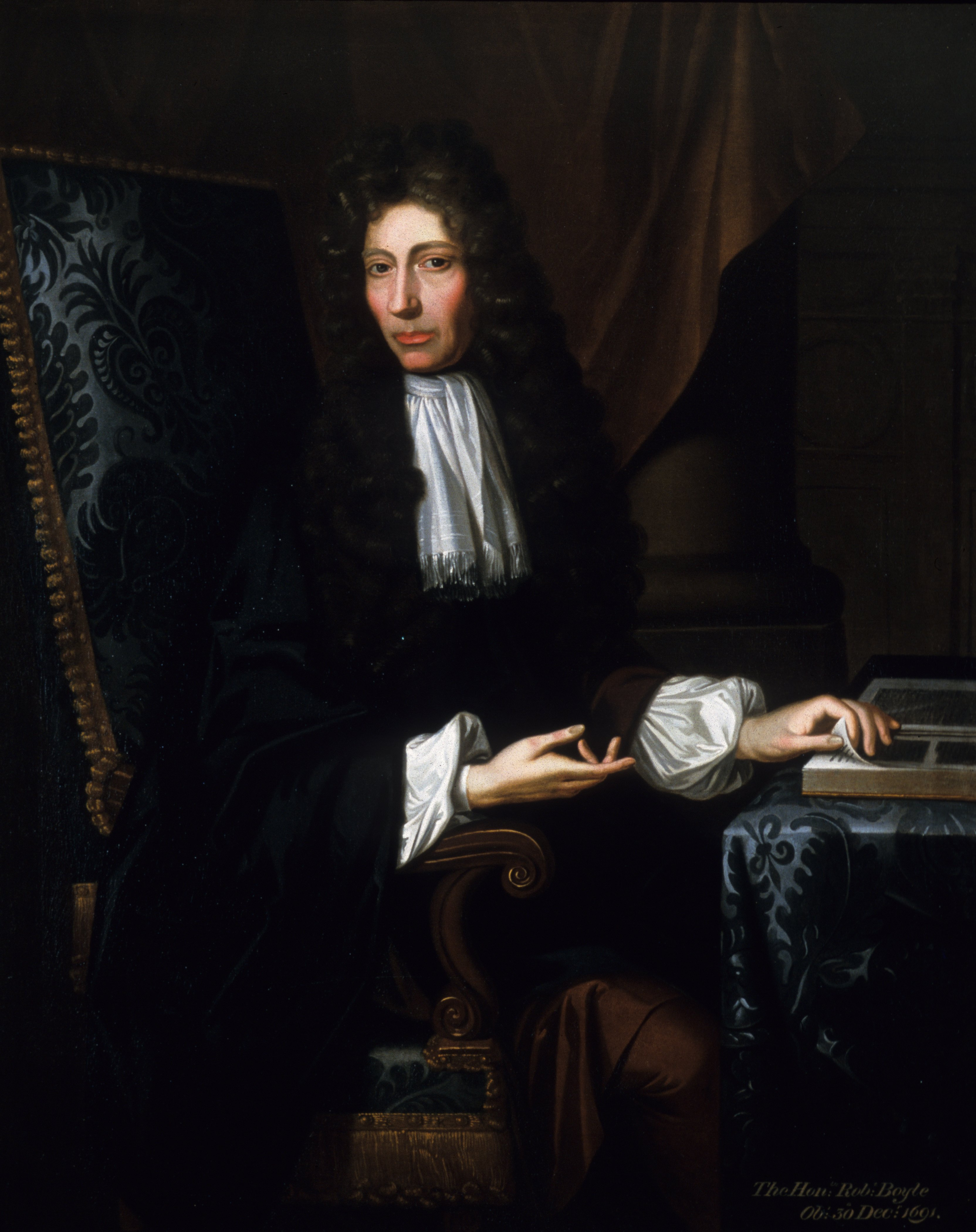
Robert Boyle, who pioneered the idea of an absolute zero.

One of the first to discuss the possibility of an absolute minimal temperature was Robert Boyle. His 1665 New Experiments and Observations touching Cold, articulated the dispute known as the primum frigidum. The concept was well known among naturalists of the time. Some contended an absolute minimum temperature occurred within earth (as one of the four classical elements), others within water, others air, and some more recently within nitre. But all of them seemed to agree that, "There is some body or other that is of its own nature supremely cold and by participation of which all other bodies obtain that quality."

=== Limit to the "degree of cold" ===
The question of whether there is a limit to the degree of coldness possible, and, if so, where the zero must be placed, was first addressed by the French physicist Guillaume Amontons in 1703, in connection with his improvements in the air thermometer. His instrument indicated temperatures by the height at which a certain mass of air sustained a column of mercury—the pressure, or "spring" of the air varying with temperature. Amontons therefore argued that the zero of his thermometer would be that temperature at which the spring of the air was reduced to nothing. He used a scale that marked the boiling point of water at +73 and the melting point of ice at +51 1/2, so that the zero was equivalent to about −240 on the Celsius scale. Amontons held that the absolute zero cannot be reached, so never attempted to compute it explicitly. The value of −240 °C, or "431 divisions [in Fahrenheit's thermometer] below the cold of freezing water" was published by George Martine in 1740.

This close approximation to the modern value of −273.15 °C for the zero of the air thermometer was further improved upon in 1779 by Johann Heinrich Lambert, who observed that −270 °C (−454.00 °F; 3.15 K) might be regarded as absolute cold.

Values of this order for the absolute zero were not, however, universally accepted about this period. Pierre-Simon Laplace and Antoine Lavoisier, in their 1780 treatise on heat, arrived at values ranging from 1,500 to 3,000 below the freezing point of water, and thought that in any case it must be at least 600 below. John Dalton in his Chemical Philosophy gave ten calculations of this value, and finally adopted −3,000 °C as the natural zero of temperature.

=== Charles's law ===
From 1787 to 1802, it was determined by Jacques Charles (unpublished), John Dalton, and Joseph Louis Gay-Lussac that, at constant pressure, ideal gases expanded or contracted their volume linearly (Charles's law) by about 1/273 parts per degree Celsius of temperature's change up or down, between 0° and 100 °C. This suggested that the volume of a gas cooled at about −273 °C would reach zero.

=== Lord Kelvin's work ===
After James Prescott Joule had determined the mechanical equivalent of heat, Lord Kelvin approached the question from an entirely different point of view, and in 1848 devised a scale of absolute temperature that was independent of the properties of any particular substance and was based on Carnot's theory of the Motive Power of Heat and data published by Henri Victor Regnault. It followed from the principles on which this scale was constructed that its zero was placed at −273 °C, at almost precisely the same point as the zero of the air thermometer, where the air volume would reach "nothing". This value was not immediately accepted; values ranging from −271.1 °C (−455.98 °F) to −274.5 °C (−462.10 °F), derived from laboratory measurements and observations of astronomical refraction, remained in use in the early 20th century.

High-precision gas thermometry in the 1930s further narrowed the value. In 1937, Masao Kinoshita and Jiro Oishi reported measurements of expansion and pressure coefficients for nitrogen, hydrogen, helium, and neon, deriving the absolute temperature of 0 °C. The Tokyo Tech Museum and Archives later identified Kinoshita and Oishi's measurements, which gave a value close to 273.15 K for the ice point, as part of the experimental basis for the value adopted in 1954 thermometry discussions.

=== The race to absolute zero ===
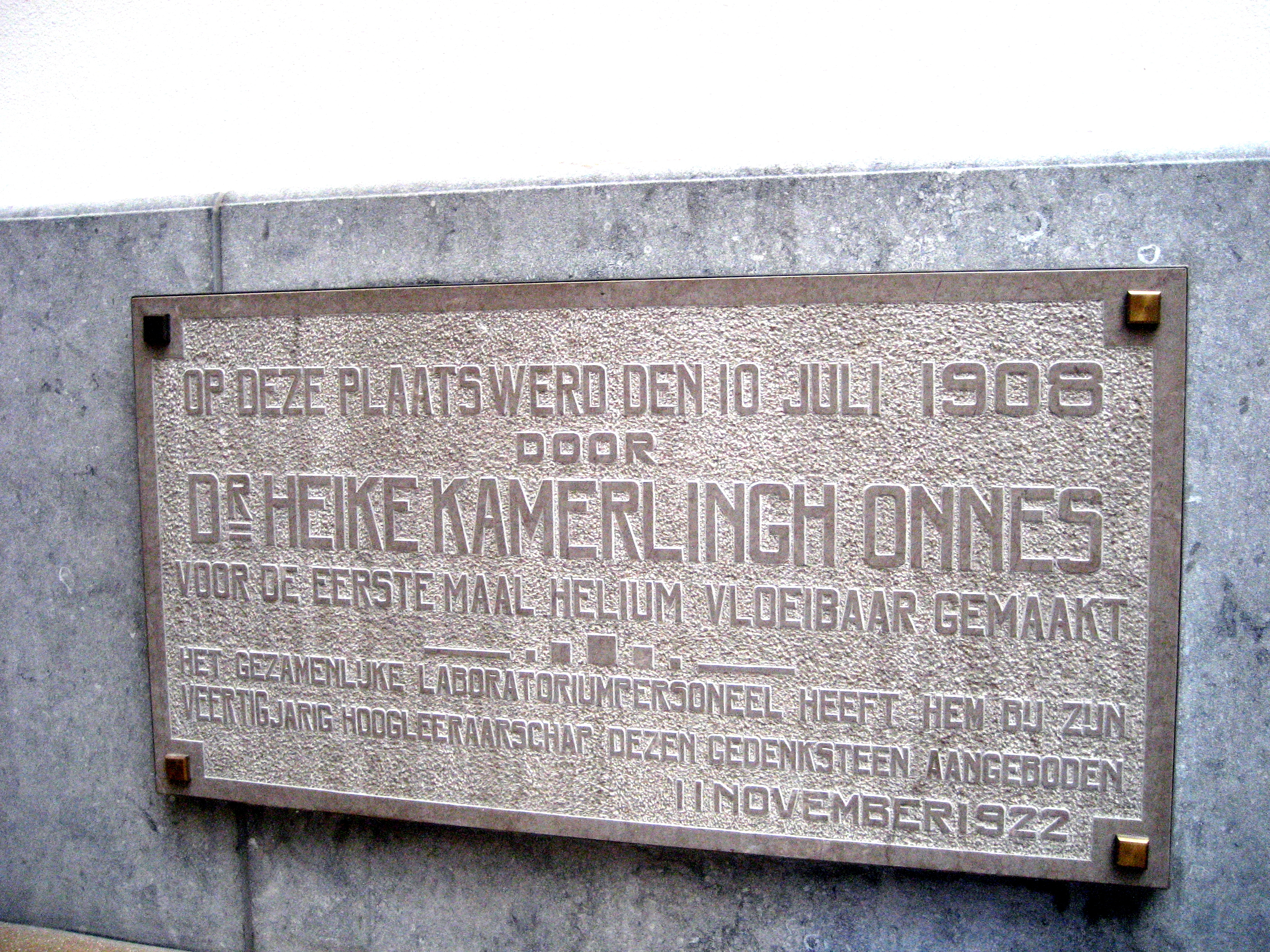
Commemorative plaque in Leiden

With a better theoretical understanding of absolute zero, scientists were eager to reach this temperature in the lab. By 1845, Michael Faraday had managed to liquefy most gases then known to exist, and reached a new record for lowest temperatures by reaching −130 °C (−202 °F; 143 K). Faraday believed that certain gases, such as oxygen, nitrogen, and hydrogen, were permanent gases and could not be liquefied. Decades later, in 1873 Dutch theoretical scientist Johannes Diderik van der Waals demonstrated that these gases could be liquefied, but only under conditions of very high pressure and very low temperatures. In 1877, Louis Paul Cailletet in France and Raoul Pictet in Switzerland succeeded in producing the first droplets of liquid air at −195 °C (−319.0 °F; 78.1 K). This was followed in 1883 by the production of liquid oxygen −218 °C (−360.4 °F; 55.1 K) by the Polish professors Zygmunt Wróblewski and Karol Olszewski.

Scottish chemist and physicist James Dewar and Dutch physicist Heike Kamerlingh Onnes took on the challenge to liquefy the remaining gases, hydrogen and helium. In 1898, after 20 years of effort, Dewar was the first to liquefy hydrogen, reaching a new low-temperature record of −252 °C (−421.6 °F; 21.1 K). However, Kamerlingh Onnes, his rival, was the first to liquefy helium, in 1908, using several precooling stages and the Hampson–Linde cycle. He lowered the temperature to the boiling point of helium −269 °C (−452.20 °F; 4.15 K). By reducing the pressure of the liquid helium, he achieved an even lower temperature, near 1.5 K. These were the coldest temperatures achieved on Earth at the time and his achievement earned him the Nobel Prize in 1913. Kamerlingh Onnes would continue to study the properties of materials at temperatures near absolute zero, describing superconductivity and superfluids for the first time.

== Negative temperatures ==
Temperatures below zero on the Celsius or Fahrenheit scales are simply colder than the zero points of those scales. In contrast, certain isolated systems can achieve negative thermodynamic temperatures (in kelvins), which are not colder than absolute zero, but paradoxically hotter than any positive temperature. If a negative-temperature system and a positive-temperature system come in contact, heat flows from the negative to the positive-temperature system.

Negative temperatures can only occur in systems that have an upper limit to the energy they can contain. In these cases, adding energy can decrease entropy, reversing the usual relationship between energy and temperature. This leads to a negative thermodynamic temperature. However, such conditions only arise in specialized, quasi-equilibrium systems such as collections of spins in a magnetic field. In contrast, ordinary systems with translational or vibrational motion have no upper energy limit, so their temperatures are always positive.

== Very low temperatures ==
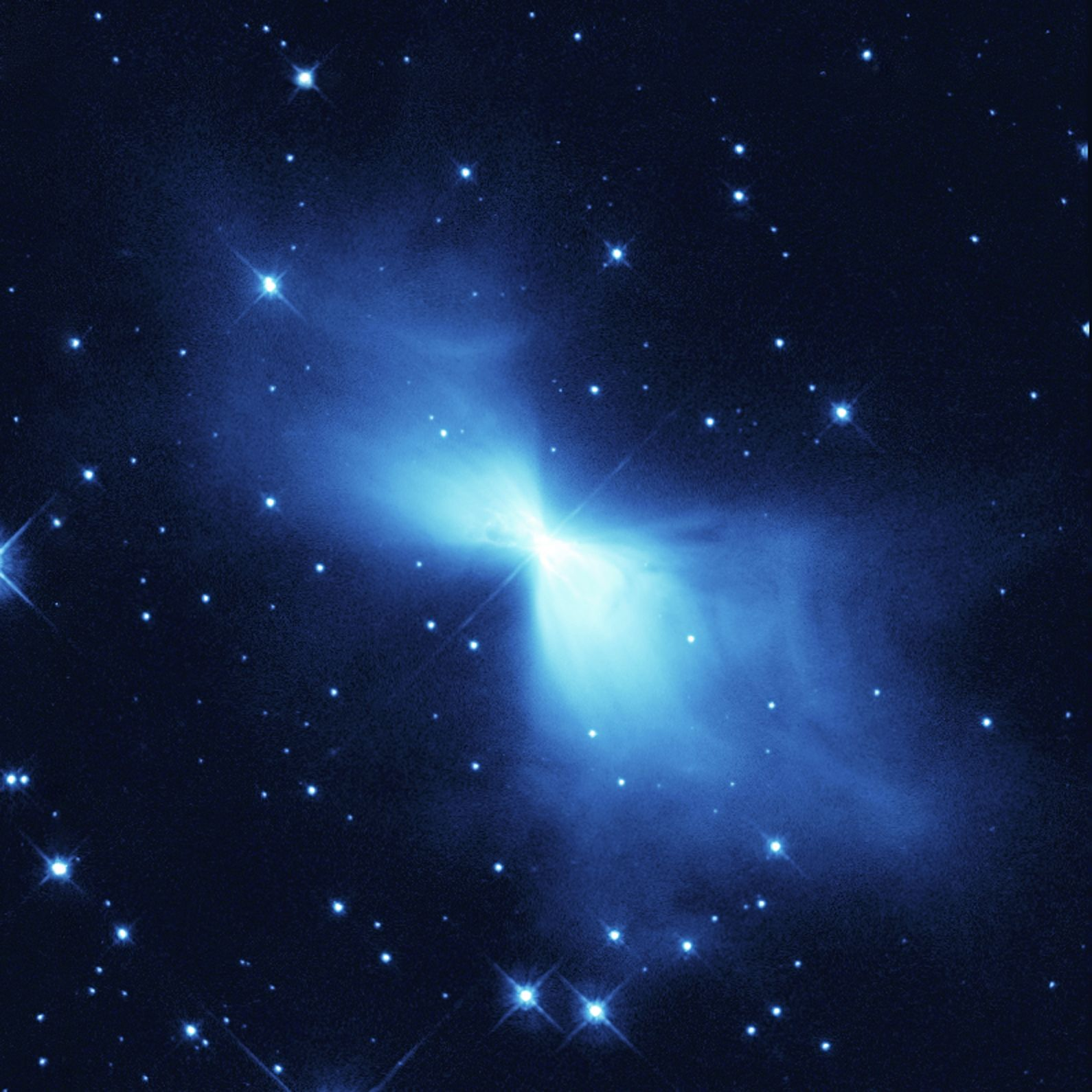
The rapid expansion of gases leaving the Boomerang Nebula, a bi-polar, filamentary, likely proto-planetary nebula in Centaurus, has a temperature of 1 K, the lowest observed outside of a laboratory.

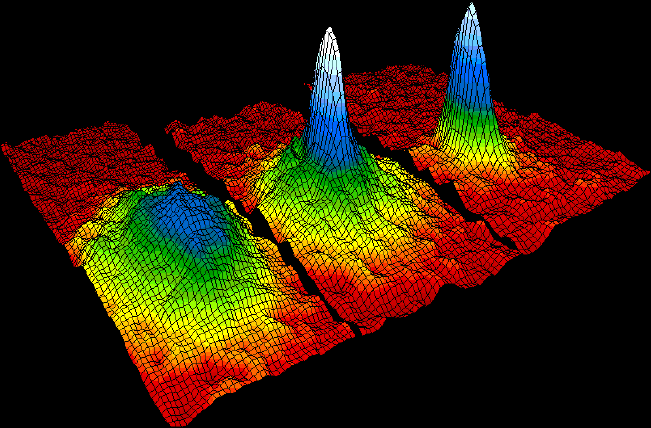
Velocity-distribution data of a gas of rubidium atoms at a temperature within a few billionths of a degree above absolute zero. Left: just before the appearance of a Bose–Einstein condensate. Center: just after the appearance of the condensate. Right: after further evaporation, leaving a sample of nearly pure condensate.

The average temperature of the universe today is approximately 2.73 K (−270.42 °C; −454.76 °F), based on measurements of cosmic microwave background radiation. Standard models of the future expansion of the universe predict that the average temperature of the universe is decreasing over time. This temperature is calculated as the mean density of energy in space; it should not be confused with the mean electron temperature (total energy divided by particle count) which has increased over time.

Absolute zero cannot be achieved, although it is possible to reach temperatures close to it through the use of evaporative cooling, cryocoolers, dilution refrigerators, and nuclear adiabatic demagnetization. The use of laser cooling has produced temperatures of less than a billionth of a kelvin. At very low temperatures in the vicinity of absolute zero, matter exhibits many unusual properties, including superconductivity, superfluidity, and Bose–Einstein condensation. To study such phenomena, scientists have worked to obtain even lower temperatures.

- In November 2000, nuclear spin temperatures below 100 picokelvin were reported for an experiment at the Helsinki University of Technology's Low Temperature Lab in Espoo, Finland. However, this was the temperature of one particular degree of freedom—a quantum property called nuclear spin—not the overall average thermodynamic temperature for all possible degrees in freedom.
- In February 2003, the Boomerang Nebula was observed to have been releasing gases at a speed of 500,000 km/h (310,000 mph) for the last 1,500 years. This has cooled it down to approximately 1 K, as deduced by astronomical observation, which is the lowest natural temperature ever recorded.
- In November 2003, 90377 Sedna was discovered and is one of the coldest known objects in the Solar System, with an average surface temperature of −240 °C (33 K; −400 °F), due to its extremely far orbit of 903 astronomical units.
- In May 2005, the European Space Agency proposed research in space to achieve femtokelvin temperatures.
- In May 2006, the Institute of Quantum Optics at the University of Hannover gave details of technologies and benefits of femtokelvin research in space.
- In January 2013, physicist Ulrich Schneider of LMU Munich in Germany reported to have achieved temperatures formally below absolute zero ("negative temperature") in gases. The gas is artificially forced out of equilibrium into a high potential energy state, which is, however, cold. When it then emits radiation it approaches the equilibrium, and can continue emitting despite reaching formal absolute zero; thus, the temperature is formally negative.
- In September 2014, scientists in the CUORE collaboration at the Laboratori Nazionali del Gran Sasso in Italy cooled a copper vessel with a volume of one cubic meter to 0.006 K (−273.144 °C; −459.659 °F) for 15 days, setting a record for the lowest temperature in the known universe over such a large contiguous volume.
- In June 2015, experimental physicists at MIT cooled molecules in a gas of sodium potassium to a temperature of 500 nanokelvin, and it is expected to exhibit an exotic state of matter by cooling these molecules somewhat further.
- In 2017, Cold Atom Laboratory (CAL), an experimental instrument was developed for launch to the International Space Station (ISS) in 2018. The instrument has created extremely cold conditions in the microgravity environment of the ISS leading to the formation of Bose–Einstein condensates. In this space-based laboratory, temperatures as low as 1 picokelvin are projected to be achievable, and it could further the exploration of unknown quantum mechanical phenomena and test some of the most fundamental laws of physics.
- The current world record for effective temperatures was set in 2021 at 38 picokelvin through matter-wave lensing of rubidium Bose–Einstein condensates.

== See also ==
- Degenerate matter
- Kelvin (unit of temperature)
- Charles's law
- Heat
- International Temperature Scale of 1990
- Orders of magnitude (temperature)
- Thermodynamic temperature
- Triple point
- Ultracold atom
- Kinetic energy
- Entropy
- Planck temperature and Hagedorn temperature, hypothetical upper limits to the thermodynamic temperature scale
