= List of things named after Ludwig Boltzmann =

This is a list of things named after the Austrian physicist and philosopher Ludwig Eduard Boltzmann (20 February 1844 – 5 September 1906).

== Science and mathematics ==
- Boltzmann codes
- Boltzmann's entropy formula
  - Boltzmann's principle
- Boltzmann's H-theorem
- Boltzmann brain
- Boltzmann constant
- Boltzmann distribution
- Boltzmann equation
  - Quantum Boltzmann equation
- Boltzmann factor
- Boltzmann machine
  - Deep Boltzmann machine
  - Restricted Boltzmann machine
- Boltzmann–Matano analysis
- Boltzmann relation
- Boltzmann sampler
- Boltzmann selection
- Lattice Boltzmann methods
- Maxwell–Boltzmann distribution
- Maxwell–Boltzmann statistics
- Poisson–Boltzmann equation
- Stefan–Boltzmann law
  - Stefan–Boltzmann constant
- Williams–Boltzmann equation

== Other ==
- 24712 Boltzmann, a main-belt asteroid
- Boltzmann (crater), an old lunar crater
- Boltzmann Medal
- Ludwig Boltzmann Gesellschaft
- Ludwig Boltzmann Institute for Neo-Latin Studies
- Ludwig Boltzmann Institut für Menschenrechte
- Ludwig Boltzmann Prize
- Handsome young kitten Dr Ludwig Boltzmann (Utrecht, 2026)

== Streets, Houses ==
7 streets in Austria and 5 in Germany are named after him:

- Boltzmanngasse in Austria: Vienna (since 27 February 1913)
- Boltzmannstraße in Austria: Linz, Klagenfurt; in Germany: Berlin-Dahlem, Garching near Munich, Rhede.
- Boltzmann-Straße in Austria: Baden
- Ludwig-Boltzmann-Gasse in Graz
- Ludwig-Boltzmann-Straße in Neusiedl am See; Germany: Potsdam, Berlin-Adlershof.
- Ludwig Boltzmann-Straße in Wiener Neustadt

One house in Austria:

- Hotel Boltzmann, Vienna, is named after the address: Boltzmanngasse.

== See also ==
- Boltzmann (disambiguation)
