= Boltzmann (disambiguation) =

Ludwig Boltzmann was an Austrian physicist famous for his founding contributions in the fields of statistical mechanics and statistical thermodynamics.

Boltzmann may also refer to:

- 24712 Boltzmann, a main-belt asteroid
- the Boltzmann brain, a thought experiment
- Boltzmann constant
- Boltzmann (crater), an old lunar crater
- Boltzmann distribution
- Boltzmann equation
- Boltzmann's entropy formula
- Boltzmann relation
- Stefan–Boltzmann law
- Stefan–Boltzmann constant
