= Ignacij Klemenčič =

Carniolan (Slovenian) physicist (1853-1901)

Ignacij Klemenčič (6 February 1853, in Kamni Potok – 5 September 1901, in Trebnje) was a Carniolan (Slovenian) physicist.

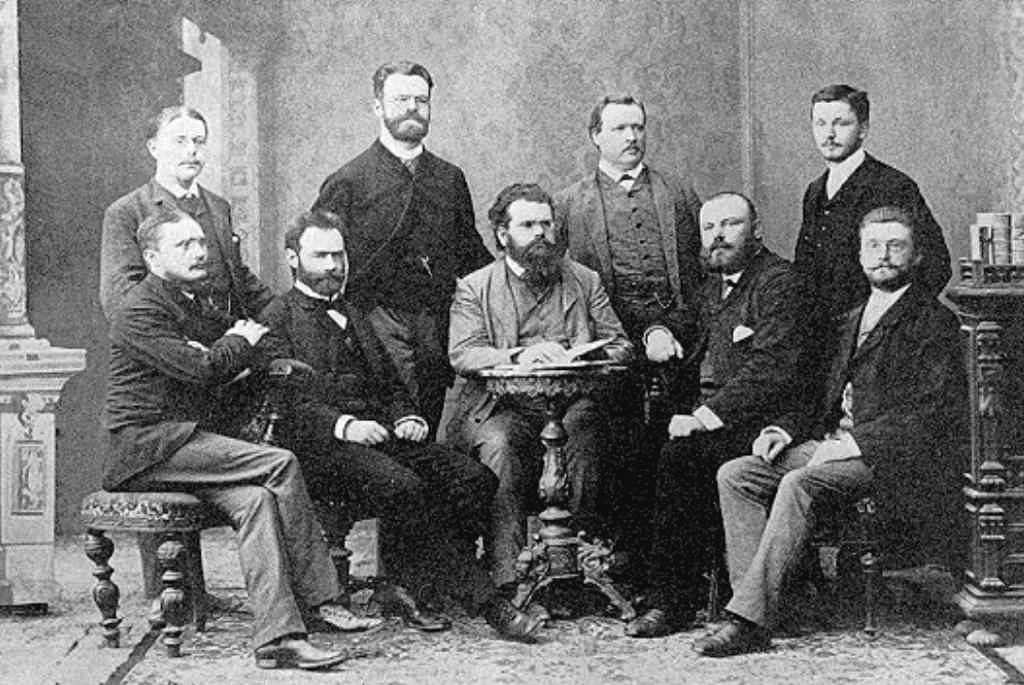
Ludwig Boltzmann and co-workers in Graz, 1887. (standing, from the left) Nernst, Streintz, Arrhenius, Hiecke, (sitting, from the left) Aulinger, Ettingshausen, Boltzmann, Klemenčič, Hausmanninger
