= Maxwell–Boltzmann =

Maxwell–Boltzmann may refer to:

- Maxwell–Boltzmann statistics, statistical distribution of material particles over various energy states in thermal equilibrium
- Maxwell–Boltzmann distribution, particle speeds in gases

== See also ==
- Maxwell (disambiguation)
- Boltzmann (disambiguation)
