= Karl Pribram =

Karl Pribram or Přibram may refer to:

- Karl Přibram (1877–1973), Austrian-born economist
- Karl H. Pribram (1919–2015), Austrian-born neurosurgeon and theorist of cognition

== See also ==
- Karl Przibram (1878–1973), Austrian physicist
