= Boltzmann–Matano analysis =

The Boltzmann–Matano method is used to convert the partial differential equation resulting from Fick's law of diffusion into a more easily solved ordinary differential equation, which can then be applied to calculate the diffusion coefficient as a function of concentration.

Ludwig Boltzmann worked on Fick's second law to convert it into an ordinary differential equation, whereas Chujiro Matano performed experiments with diffusion couples and calculated the diffusion coefficients as a function of concentration in metal alloys. Specifically, Matano proved that the diffusion rate of A atoms into a B-atom crystal lattice is a function of the amount of A atoms already in the B lattice.

The importance of the classic Boltzmann–Matano method consists in the ability to extract diffusivities from concentration–distance data. These methods, also known as inverse methods, have both proven to be reliable, convenient and accurate with the assistance of modern computational techniques.

== Boltzmann’s transformation ==
Boltzmann's transformation converts Fick's second law into an easily solvable ordinary differential equation. Assuming a diffusion coefficient D that is in general a function of concentration c, Fick's second law is

$$\frac{\partial c}{\partial t} = \frac{\partial}{\partial x} \underbrace{\left[ D(c)\frac{\partial c}{\partial x} \right]}_\text{flux},$$

where t is time, and x is distance.

Boltzmann's transformation consists in introducing a variable ξ, defined as a combination of t and x:

$$\xi = \frac{x}{2 \sqrt{t}}.$$

The partial derivatives of ξ are:

$$\frac{\partial \xi}{\partial t} = -\frac{x}{4 t^{3/2}} = -\frac{\xi}{2t},$$
$$\frac{\partial \xi}{\partial x} = \frac{1}{2 \sqrt{t}}.$$

To introduce ξ into Fick's law, we express its partial derivatives in terms of ξ, using the chain rule:

$$\frac{\partial c}{\partial t} = \frac{\partial c}{\partial \xi} \frac{\partial \xi}{\partial t} =  -\frac{\xi}{2 t} \frac{\partial c}{\partial \xi},$$
$$\frac{\partial c}{\partial x} = \frac{\partial c}{\partial \xi} \frac{\partial \xi}{\partial x} =  \frac{1}{2 \sqrt{t}} \frac{\partial c}{\partial \xi}.$$

Inserting these expressions into Fick's law produces the following modified form:

$$-\frac{\xi}{2 t} \frac{\partial c}{\partial \xi} = \frac{1}{2 \sqrt{t}} \frac{\partial}{\partial x} \left[ D(c) \frac{\partial c}{\partial \xi} \right].$$

Note how the time variable in the right-hand side could be taken outside of the partial derivative, since the latter regards only variable x.

It is now possible to remove the last reference to x by using again the same chain rule used above to obtain ∂ξ/∂x:

$$-\frac{\xi}{2 t} \frac{\partial c}{\partial \xi} = \frac{1}{4 t} \frac{\partial}{\partial \xi} \left[ D(c) \frac{\partial c}{\partial \xi} \right].$$

Because of the appropriate choice in the definition of ξ, the time variable t can now also be eliminated, leaving ξ as the only variable in the equation, which is now an ordinary differential equation:

$$-2\xi \frac{\mathrm{d} c}{\mathrm{d} \xi} = \frac{\mathrm{d}}{\mathrm{d} \xi} \left[ D(c) \frac{\mathrm{d} c}{\mathrm{d} \xi} \right].$$

This form is significantly easier to solve numerically, and one only needs to perform a back-substitution of t or x into the definition of ξ to find the value of the other variable.

=== The parabolic law ===
Observing the previous equation, a trivial solution is found for the case dc/dξ = 0, that is when concentration is constant over ξ. This can be interpreted as the rate of advancement of a concentration front being proportional to the square root of time ($x \propto \sqrt t$), or, equivalently, to the time necessary for a concentration front to arrive at a certain position being proportional to the square of the distance ($t \propto x^2$); the square term gives the name parabolic law.

== Matano’s method ==
Chuijiro Matano applied Boltzmann's transformation to obtain a method to calculate diffusion coefficients as a function of concentration in metal alloys. Two alloys with different concentration would be put into contact, and annealed at a given temperature for a given time t, typically several hours; the sample is then cooled to ambient temperature, and the concentration profile is virtually "frozen". The concentration profile c at time t can then be extracted as a function of the x coordinate.

In Matano's notation, the two concentrations are indicated as c_{L} and c_{R} (L and R for left and right, as shown in most diagrams), with the implicit assumption that c_{L} > c_{R}; this is however not strictly necessary as the formulas hold also if c_{R} is the larger one. The initial conditions are:

$$c=c_L \qquad \forall x<0$$
$$c=c_R \qquad \forall x>0$$

Also, the alloys on both sides are assumed to stretch to infinity, which means in practice that they are large enough that the concentration at their other ends is unaffected by the transient for the entire duration of the experiment.

To extract D from Boltzmann's formulation above, we integrate it from ξ=+∞, where c=c_{R} at all times, to a generic ξ^{*}; we can immediately simplify dξ, and with a change of variables we get:

$$-2\int_{c_R}^{c^*} \xi \mathrm{d}c = \int_{c=c_R}^{c=c^*} \mathrm{d}\left[ D(c)\left(\frac{\mathrm{d}c}{\mathrm{d}\xi}\right)\right]$$

We can translate ξ back into its definition and bring the t terms out of the integrals, as t is constant and given as the time of annealing in the Matano method; on the right-hand side, extraction from the integral is trivial and follows from definition.

$$-\frac{1}{2 t} \int_{c_R}^{c^*} x \mathrm{d}c = \left[ D(c)\left(\frac{\mathrm{d}c}{\mathrm{d}x}\right)\right]_{c=c_R}^{c=c^*}$$

We know that dc/dx → 0 as c → c_{R}, that is the concentration curve "flattens out" when approaching the limit concentration value. We can then rearrange:

$$D(c^*) = - \frac{1}{2 t} \frac{\int^{c^*}_{c_R} x \mathrm{d}c}{(\mathrm{d}c/\mathrm{d}x)_{c=c^*}}$$

Knowing the concentration profile c(x) at annealing time t, and assuming it is invertible as x(c), we can then calculate the diffusion coefficient for all concentrations between c_{R} and c_{L}.

=== The Matano interface ===
The last formula has one significant shortcoming: no information is given about the reference according to which x should be measured. It was not necessary to introduce one as Boltzmann's transformation worked fine without a specific reference for x; it is easy to verify that the Boltzmann transformation holds also when using x-X_{M} instead of plain x.

X_{M} is often indicated as the Matano interface, and is in general not coincident with x=0: since D is in general variable with concentration c, the concentration profile is not necessarily symmetric. Introducing X_{M} in the expression for D(c^{*}) above, however, introduces a bias that appears to make the value of D completely an arbitrary function of which X_{M} we choose.

X_{M}, however, can only assume one value due to physical constraints. Since the denominator term dc/dx goes to zero for c → c_{L} (as the concentration profile flattens out), the integral in the numerator must also tend to zero in the same conditions. If this were not the case D(c_{L}) would tend to infinity, which is not physically meaningful. Note that, strictly speaking, this does not guarantee that D does not tend to infinity, but it is one of the necessary conditions to ensure that it does not. The condition is then:

$$0 = \int^{c_L}_{c_R} (x-X_M) \mathrm{d}c$$
$$X_M = \frac{1}{c_L-c_R} \int^{c_L}_{c_R} x \mathrm{d}c$$

In other words, X_{M} is the average position weighed on concentrations, and can be easily found from the concentration profile providing it is invertible to the form x(c).

== Sources ==
- M. E. Glicksman, Diffusion in Solids: Field Theory, Solid-State Principles, and Applications, Wiley, New York, 2000.
- Matano, Chujiro. "On the Relation between the Diffusion-Coefficients and Concentrations of Solid Metals (The Nickel-Copper System)". Japanese Journal of Physics. Jan. 16, 1933.
