= Energeticism =

View that energy is the fundamental element in all physical change

Energeticism, also called energism or energetics (Note: Not to be confused with "energetics" as used by others to refers to the study of energy and thermodynamics.) (German: Energetik), is a superseded theory in science that posits that energy is the ultimate element of physical reality. Energeticism was developed during the end of the 19th century by Wilhelm Ostwald, Georg Helm and Pierre Duhem. It was also promoted by physicist Ernst Mach who opposed atomic theory, though his full commitment to it was sometimes ambiguous. Energetiscism attempted to substitute the hypothesis of atoms and molecules by energy relations.

Ludwig Boltzmann and Max Planck constantly rebutted the idea of energeticism in favor of atomic theory. The program of energeticism faded away in the 20th century with the experimental confirmation of the existence of atoms.

== Origin ==
While teaching chemistry in Riga Polytechnic Institute, Wilhelm Ostwald became convinced that certain reactions could only be explained in terms of energy, without the need of invoking the hypothesis of the existence of atoms. He was inspired by Josiah Willard Gibbs's work on thermodynamics. During an inaugural lecture in 1887 in Leipzig University, Ostwald outlined his program of energetics as an alternative to atomic theory. In his second edition of his textbook on physical chemistry of 1892, he stressed that energetic ideas should avoid all atomistic considerations. He opposed the reduction of chemistry to mechanics and advocated for the reduction of mass and matter to energy.

In parallel, mathematician Georg Helm published his energy principle in The Theory of Energy (German: Die Lehre von der Energie) in 1887, as an extension to the principle of conservation of energy. In his essay of 1890, he proposed to reduce mechanics to energetics by means of his principle. In 1892, he proposed to do the same for electricity and magnetism. His principle can be written as

$$\mathrm d U \leq T\mathrm d S - p \mathrm d V$$,

where dU is a change in the internal energy of a system, T is the temperature, dS is a change in the entropy, p is the pressure and dV a change in volume. This principle recovers the first law of thermodynamics only when the equality holds. Helm changed the equal sign into an inequality in the hope to account for irreversible processes.

== Lübeck debate ==
The Lübeck Scientific Conference (German: Lübeck Naturforscherversammlung) took place in September 1895, with mathematician Georg Helm and Ostwald supporting energeticism in the debate, and Boltzmann and mathematician Felix Klein supporting atomism. Boltzmann had already prepared his arguments in private correspondence with Ostwald after the publication of his book. Mach was not present. Arnold Sommerfeld records his impression of the conference:

The fight between Boltzmann and Ostwald resembled, both externally and internally, the struggle between a bull and a supple fencer. But the bull defeated the matador in spite of all of the latter's fencing skill. The arguments of Boltzmann broke through. We, who were then young mathematicians, all supported Boltzmann. It was quite obvious to us that it was impossible to derive the motion equations of a single mass point from an energy equation, to say nothing of optional degrees of freedom.

After the conference, Helm and Ostwald hurried to write response articles. Mach finished his book Principles of the Theory of Heat in 1886, in which he recorded that energeticism, even if flawed, was better than Boltzmann's mechanistic theories. Max Planck wrote an article after the conference "Against the New Energetics", in opposition to Ostwald's theory.

== Duhem's energetics ==
In France, energetics (French: énergetique) was championed by physicist and science philosopher Pierre Duhem. He was convinced that all chemistry and physics, including mechanics, electricity and magnetism, could be derived from thermodynamic principles. He opposed the idea of atoms as constituents of matter.

Duhem wrote a publication in 1897 on chemical mechanics where he used the term energetics. This publication developed into a thermodynamics course from 1898 to 1899, unofficially titled "Énergetique". Duhem developed an specialized course on energetics from 1904 to 1909, to be published later.

Duhem send a draft of his critique on James Clerk Maxwell's electrodynamics to Pierre Curie in 1902. He found Duhem's critique imprudent and lacking a proper alternative. Curie told Duhem "I am in complete disagreement with your theory of magnetism".

In 1903, Jean Baptiste Perrin in his book Traité de la chimie physique criticised energetics for its "theoretical obscurities". A year later, Paul Langevin was the first to take his disagreement with Duhem publicly during symposium at the Musée de pédagogie in Paris. Langevin referred to energeticism as an ignorabimus, attempting to set limitations on scientific knowledge.

Duhem finally published his two volume Treatise on energetics (French: Traité d'energétique) in 1911 which was well received by Ostwald and Helm. None of Albert Einstein's contributions were mentioned.

== Ostwald's renunciation as a physical theory ==
Under the evidence of Perrin's experiments that confirmed Einstein's theory on Brownian motion, Ostwald renounced energeticism as physical theory in his fourth edition of Outline of General Chemistry in 1908, embracing atomic theory. However he modified energeticism into an ontological philosophy, supported by the recently discovered Einstein's mass–energy equivalence E=mc^{2}.

By 1918 most physicists had adhered to atomic theory.

== Sociology and psychology ==
After 1908, Ostwald redirected his philosophy to sociological and cultural phenomena as part of sociological energetics (German: Soziologische Energetik). He attempted to create a hierarchy to classify the sciences and social sciences based on life, energy and order.

Sociologist Max Weber opposed Ostwald views. In 1909, Weber accused sociological energetics of being ideological, underrating the complexity of the social sciences and overrating the importance of recasting phenomena in energetic terminology. Weber also objected to the idea of 'psychological energy' to explain psychology and accused Ostwald of trying to derive an 'is from an ought'.

== See also ==
- Mass–energy equivalence
- History of atomic theory
