= Boltzmann brain =

Philosophical thought experiment

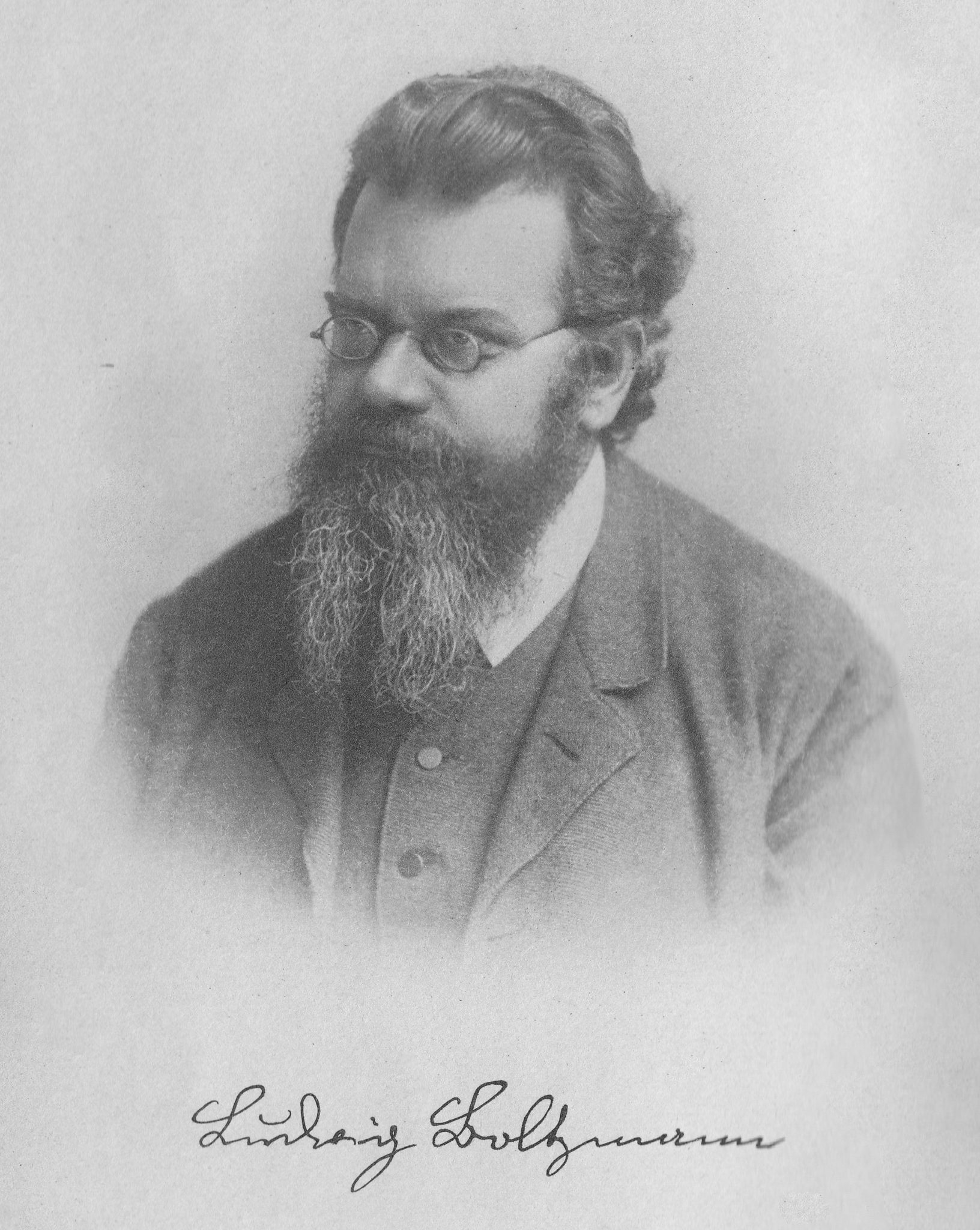
Ludwig Boltzmann

The Boltzmann brain thought experiment suggests that it is more probable for a brain to spontaneously form, complete with a memory of having existed in our universe, than for the entire universe to come about in the manner cosmologists think it did. Physicists use the Boltzmann brain thought experiment as a reductio ad absurdum argument for evaluating competing scientific theories.

In contrast to brain in a vat thought experiments, which are about perception and thought, Boltzmann brains are used in cosmology to test our assumptions about thermodynamics and the development of the universe. Over a sufficiently long time, random fluctuations could cause particles to spontaneously form any structure of any degree of complexity, including a functioning human brain. The scenario initially involved only a single brain with false memories; however, physicist Sean M. Carroll pointed out that, in a fluctuating universe, the scenario works just as well at larger scales, like that of entire bodies or even galaxies.

The idea is named after the physicist Ludwig Boltzmann (1844–1906), who published a hypothesis in 1896, prior to the Big Bang theory, that tried to account for the fact that the universe is not as chaotic as the budding field of thermodynamics seemed to predict. He offered several explanations, one of them being that the universe, even after it had progressed to its most likely spread-out and featureless state of thermal equilibrium, would spontaneously fluctuate to a more ordered (or low-entropy) state such as the universe in which we find ourselves. Boltzmann brains were first proposed as a reductio ad absurdum response to Boltzmann's explanation for the low-entropy state of our universe.

The Boltzmann brain gained new relevance around 2002, when some cosmologists started to become concerned that, in many theories about the universe, human brains are vastly more likely to arise from random fluctuations; this leads to the conclusion that, statistically, humans are likely to be wrong about their memories of the past and in fact are Boltzmann brains. When applied to more recent theories about the multiverse, Boltzmann brain arguments are part of the unsolved measure problem of cosmology.

== Boltzmann universe ==
In 1896, the mathematician Ernst Zermelo advanced a theory that the second law of thermodynamics was absolute rather than statistical. Zermelo bolstered his theory by pointing out that the Poincaré recurrence theorem shows statistical entropy in a closed system must eventually be a periodic function; therefore, the Second Law, which is always observed to increase entropy, is unlikely to be statistical. To counter Zermelo's argument, Boltzmann advanced two theories. The first theory, now believed to be the correct one, is that the universe started for some unknown reason in a low-entropy state. The second and alternative theory, published in 1896 but attributed in 1895 to Boltzmann's assistant Ignaz Schütz, is the "Boltzmann universe" scenario. In this scenario, the universe spends the vast majority of eternity in a featureless state of heat death; however, over enough eons, eventually, a very rare thermal fluctuation will occur where atoms bounce off each other in exactly such a way as to form a substructure equivalent to our entire observable universe. Boltzmann argues that, while most of the universe is featureless, humans do not see those regions because they are devoid of intelligent life; to Boltzmann, it is unremarkable that humanity views solely the interior of its Boltzmann universe, as that is the only place where intelligent life lives. This may be the first use in modern science of the anthropic principle.

In 1931, astronomer Arthur Eddington pointed out that, because a large fluctuation is exponentially less probable than a small fluctuation, observers in Boltzmann universes will be vastly outnumbered by observers in smaller fluctuations. Physicist Richard Feynman published a similar counterargument within his widely read Feynman Lectures on Physics. By 2004, physicists had pushed Eddington's observation to its logical conclusion: the most numerous observers in an eternity of thermal fluctuations would be minimal "Boltzmann brains" popping up in an otherwise featureless universe.

== Spontaneous formation ==
In the universe's eventual state of ergodic "heat death", given enough time, every possible structure (including every possible brain) will presumably get formed via random fluctuation, the timescale of which is related to the Poincaré recurrence time. A Boltzmann brain (or body or world) need not fluctuate suddenly into existence, argue Anthony Aguirre, Sean M. Carroll, and Matthew C. Johnson. Rather, it would form in a sequence of smaller fluctuations that would look like the brain's decay path run in reverse. Boltzmann-style thought experiments generally focus on structures like human brains that are presumably self-aware observers. However, smaller structures that minimally meet the criteria are vastly and exponentially more common than larger structures; a rough analogy is how the odds of a single real English word showing up when one shakes a box of Scrabble letters are greater than the odds that a whole English sentence or paragraph will form. The average timescale required for the formation of a Boltzmann brain is vastly greater than the current age of the universe. In modern physics, Boltzmann brains can be formed either by quantum fluctuation, or by a thermal fluctuation generally involving nucleation.

=== Via quantum fluctuation ===
By one calculation, a Boltzmann brain would appear as a quantum fluctuation in the vacuum after a time interval of $10^{10^{50}}$ years. This fluctuation can occur even in a true Minkowski vacuum (a flat spacetime vacuum lacking vacuum energy). Quantum mechanics heavily favors smaller fluctuations that "borrow" the least amount of energy from the vacuum. Typically, a quantum Boltzmann brain would suddenly appear from the vacuum (alongside an equivalent amount of virtual antimatter), remain only long enough to have a single coherent thought or observation, and then disappear into the vacuum as suddenly as it appeared. Such a brain is completely self-contained, and can never radiate energy out to infinity.

=== Via nucleation ===
Current evidence suggests that the vacuum permeating the observable universe is not a Minkowski space, but rather a de Sitter space with a positive cosmological constant. In a de Sitter vacuum (but not in a Minkowski vacuum), a Boltzmann brain can form via nucleation of non-virtual particles gradually assembled by chance from the Hawking radiation emitted from the de Sitter space's bounded cosmological horizon. One estimate for the average time required until nucleation is around $10^{10^{69}}$ years. A typical nucleated Boltzmann brain will cool off to absolute zero and eventually completely decay, as any isolated object would in the vacuum of space. Unlike the quantum fluctuation case, the Boltzmann brain will radiate energy out to infinity. In nucleation, the most common fluctuations are as close to thermal equilibrium overall as possible given whatever arbitrary criteria are provided for labeling a fluctuation a "Boltzmann brain".

Theoretically, a Boltzmann brain can also form, albeit again with a tiny probability, at any time during the matter-dominated early universe.

== Modern arguments ==
The consensus amongst cosmologists is that some yet-to-be-revealed error is hinted at by the surprising calculation that Boltzmann brains should vastly outnumber normal human brains. Sean Carroll states, "We're not arguing that Boltzmann brains exist—‌we're trying to avoid them." Carroll has stated that the hypothesis of being a Boltzmann brain results in "cognitive instability". He argues that it would take longer than the current age of the universe for a brain to form, and yet it thinks that it observes that it exists in a younger universe, and this shows that memories and reasoning processes would be untrustworthy if it were indeed a Boltzmann brain. Seth Lloyd has stated, "They fail the Monty Python test: Stop that! That's too silly!" A New Scientist journalist summarizes that "The starting point for our understanding of the universe and its behavior is that humans, not disembodied brains, are typical observers".

Some argue that brains produced via quantum fluctuation, and maybe even brains produced via nucleation in the de Sitter vacuum, do not count as observers. Quantum fluctuations are easier to exclude than nucleated brains, as quantum fluctuations can more easily be targeted by straightforward criteria (such as their lack of interaction with the environment at infinity).

Carroll believes that a better understanding of the measurement problem in quantum mechanics would show that some vacuum states have no dynamical evolution and cannot support nucleated brains, nor any other type of observer. Some cosmologists believe that a better understanding of the degrees of freedom in the quantum vacuum of holographic string theory can solve the Boltzmann brain problem.

American theoretical physicist and mathematician Brian Greene states: "I am confident that I am not a Boltzmann brain. However, we want our theories to similarly concur that we are not Boltzmann brains, but so far it has proved surprisingly difficult for them to do so".

=== In single-universe scenarios ===
In a single de Sitter universe with a cosmological constant, and starting from any finite spatial slice, the number of "normal" observers is finite and bounded by the heat death of the universe. If the universe lasts forever, the number of nucleated Boltzmann brains is, in most models, infinite; cosmologists such as Alan Guth worry that this would make it seem "infinitely unlikely for us to be normal brains". One caveat is that if the universe is a false vacuum that locally decays into a Minkowski or a Big Crunch-bound anti-de Sitter space in less than 20 billion years, then infinite Boltzmann nucleation is avoided. (If the average local false vacuum decay rate is over 20 billion years, Boltzmann brain nucleation is still infinite, as the universe increases in size faster than local vacuum collapses destroy the portions of the universe within the collapses' future light cones). Proposed hypothetical mechanisms to destroy the universe within that timeframe range from superheavy gravitinos to a heavier-than-observed top quark triggering "death by Higgs".

If no cosmological constant exists, and if the presently observed vacuum energy is from quintessence that will eventually completely dissipate, then infinite Boltzmann nucleation is also avoided.

=== In eternal inflation ===
One class of solutions to the Boltzmann brain problem makes use of differing approaches to the measure problem in cosmology: in infinite multiverse theories, the ratio of normal observers to Boltzmann brains depends on how infinite limits are taken. Measures might be chosen to avoid appreciable fractions of Boltzmann brains. Unlike the single-universe case, one challenge in finding a global solution in eternal inflation is that all possible string landscapes must be summed over; in some measures, having even a small fraction of universes permeated with Boltzmann brains causes the measure of the multiverse as a whole to be dominated by Boltzmann brains.

The measurement problem in cosmology also grapples with the ratio of normal observers to abnormally early observers. In measures such as the proper time measure that suffer from an extreme "youngness" problem, the typical observer is a "Boltzmann baby" formed by rare fluctuation in an extremely hot, early universe.

== Identifying whether oneself is a "Boltzmann observer" ==
In Boltzmann brain scenarios, the ratio of Boltzmann brains to "normal observers" is astronomically large. Almost any relevant subset of Boltzmann brains, such as "brains embedded within functioning bodies", "observers who believe they are perceiving 3 K microwave background radiation through telescopes", "observers who have a memory of coherent experiences", or "observers who have the same series of experiences as me", also vastly outnumber "normal observers". Therefore, under most models of consciousness, it is unclear that one can reliably conclude that oneself is not such a "Boltzmann observer", in a case where Boltzmann brains dominate the universe. Even under "content externalism" models of consciousness, Boltzmann observers living in a consistent Earth-sized fluctuation over the course of the past several years outnumber the "normal observers" spawned before a universe's "heat death".

As stated earlier, most Boltzmann brains have "abnormal" experiences; Feynman has pointed out that, if one knows oneself to be a typical Boltzmann brain, one does not expect "normal" observations to continue in the future. In other words, in a Boltzmann-dominated universe, most Boltzmann brains have "abnormal" experiences, but most observers with only "normal" experiences are Boltzmann brains, due to the overwhelming vastness of the population of Boltzmann brains in such a universe.

== See also ==
- Anthropic principle – Hypothesis about sapient life and the universe
- Bekenstein bound – Upper limit on entropy in physics
- China brain – Philosophical experiment
- Deep time – Time scales on the billions of years
- Dream argument – Postulation about the act of dreaming
- Evolution of biological complexity
- Heat death of the universe – Possible fate of the universe
- Heat death paradox – Paradox relating to fate of universe
- Idealism – Metaphysical position that reality is fundamentally mental
- Infinite monkey theorem – Counterintuitive result in probability
- Matrioshka brain – Huge computer powered by a star's energy
- Omphalos hypothesis – Creationist hypothesis
- Simulation hypothesis – Hypothesis that reality could be a computer simulation
- Solipsism – Philosophical idea that only one's own mind is certain to exist
- Swampman – Philosophical thought experiment concerning personal identity
- Timeline of the far future – Scientific projections regarding the far future
