= H-theorem =

Thermodynamic theorem

In classical statistical mechanics, the H-theorem, introduced by Ludwig Boltzmann in 1872, describes the tendency of the quantity H (defined below) to decrease in a nearly-ideal gas of molecules. As this quantity H was meant to represent the entropy of thermodynamics, the H-theorem was an early demonstration of the power of statistical mechanics as it claimed to derive the second law of thermodynamics—a statement about fundamentally irreversible processes—from reversible microscopic mechanics. It is thought to prove the second law of thermodynamics, albeit under the assumption of low-entropy initial conditions.

The H-theorem is a natural consequence of the kinetic equation derived by Boltzmann that has come to be known as Boltzmann's equation. The H-theorem has led to considerable discussion about its actual implications, with major themes being:

- What is entropy? In what sense does Boltzmann's quantity H correspond to the thermodynamic entropy?
- Are the assumptions (especially the assumption of molecular chaos) behind Boltzmann's equation too strong? When are these assumptions violated?

== Name and pronunciation ==
Boltzmann in his original publication writes the symbol E (as in entropy) for its statistical function. Years later, Samuel Hawksley Burbury, one of the critics of the theorem, wrote the function with the symbol H, a notation that was subsequently adopted by Boltzmann when referring to his "H-theorem". The notation has led to some confusion regarding the name of the theorem. Even though the statement is usually referred to as the "Aitch theorem", sometimes it is instead called the "Eta theorem", as the capital Greek letter Eta (Η) is indistinguishable from the capital version of Latin letter h (H). Discussions have been raised on how the symbol should be understood, but it remains unclear due to the lack of written sources from the time of the theorem. Studies of the typography and the work of J.W. Gibbs seem to favour the interpretation of H as Eta.

== Definition and meaning of Boltzmann's H ==
The H value is determined from the function f (E, t) dE, which is the energy distribution function of molecules at time t. The value f (E, t) dE is the number of molecules that have kinetic energy between E and E + dE. H itself is defined as

$$H(t) = \int_0^\infty f(E,t) \left( \ln\frac{f(E,t)}{\sqrt{E}} - 1 \right) \, dE.$$

For an isolated ideal gas (with fixed total energy and fixed total number of particles), the function H is at a minimum when the particles have a Maxwell–Boltzmann distribution; if the molecules of the ideal gas are distributed in some other way (say, all having the same kinetic energy), then the value of H will be higher. Boltzmann's H-theorem, described in the next section, shows that when collisions between molecules are allowed, such distributions are unstable and tend to irreversibly seek towards the minimum value of H (towards the Maxwell–Boltzmann distribution).

(Note on notation: Boltzmann originally used the letter E for quantity H; most of the literature after Boltzmann uses the letter H as here. Boltzmann also used the symbol x to refer to the kinetic energy of a particle.)

== Boltzmann's H theorem ==
In this mechanical model of a gas, the motion of the molecules appears very disorderly. Boltzmann showed that, assuming each collision configuration in a gas is truly random and independent, the gas converges to the Maxwell speed distribution even if it did not start out that way.

Boltzmann considered what happens during the collision between two particles. It is a basic fact of mechanics that in the elastic collision between two particles (such as hard spheres), the energy transferred between the particles varies depending on initial conditions (angle of collision, etc.).

Boltzmann made a key assumption known as the Stosszahlansatz (molecular chaos assumption), that during any collision event in the gas, the two particles participating in the collision have 1) independently chosen kinetic energies from the distribution, 2) independent velocity directions, 3) independent starting points. Under these assumptions, and given the mechanics of energy transfer, the energies of the particles after the collision will obey a certain new random distribution that can be computed.

Considering repeated uncorrelated collisions, between any and all of the molecules in the gas, Boltzmann constructed his kinetic equation (Boltzmann's equation). From this kinetic equation, a natural outcome is that the continual process of collision causes the quantity H to decrease until it has reached a minimum.

== Impact ==
Although Boltzmann's H-theorem turned out not to be the absolute proof of the second law of thermodynamics as originally claimed (see Criticisms below), the H-theorem led Boltzmann in the last years of the 19th century to more and more probabilistic arguments about the nature of thermodynamics. The probabilistic view of thermodynamics culminated in 1902 with Josiah Willard Gibbs's statistical mechanics for fully general systems (not just gases), and the introduction of generalized statistical ensembles.

The kinetic equation and in particular Boltzmann's molecular chaos assumption inspired a whole family of Boltzmann equations that are still used today to model the motions of particles, such as the electrons in a semiconductor. In many cases the molecular chaos assumption is highly accurate, and the ability to discard complex correlations between particles makes calculations much simpler.

The process of thermalisation can be described using the H-theorem or the relaxation theorem.

== Criticism and exceptions ==
There are several notable reasons described below why the H-theorem, at least in its original 1871 form, is not completely rigorous. As Boltzmann would eventually go on to admit, the arrow of time in the H-theorem is not in fact purely mechanical, but really a consequence of assumptions about initial conditions.

=== Loschmidt's paradox ===
Soon after Boltzmann published his H theorem, Johann Josef Loschmidt objected that it should not be possible to deduce an irreversible process from time-symmetric dynamics and a time-symmetric formalism. If the H decreases over time in one state, then there must be a matching reversed state where H increases over time (Loschmidt's paradox). The explanation is that Boltzmann's equation is based on the assumption of "molecular chaos", i.e., that it follows from, or at least is consistent with, the underlying kinetic model that the particles be considered independent and uncorrelated. It turns out that this assumption breaks time reversal symmetry in a subtle sense, and therefore begs the question. Once the particles are allowed to collide, their velocity directions and positions in fact do become correlated (however, these correlations are encoded in an extremely complex manner). This shows that an (ongoing) assumption of independence is not consistent with the underlying particle model.

Boltzmann's reply to Loschmidt was to concede the possibility of these states, but noting that these sorts of states were so rare and unusual as to be impossible in practice. Boltzmann would go on to sharpen this notion of the "rarity" of states, resulting in his entropy formula of 1877.

=== Spin echo ===
As a demonstration of Loschmidt's paradox, a modern counterexample (not to Boltzmann's original gas-related H-theorem, but to a closely related analogue) is the phenomenon of spin echo. In the spin echo effect, it is physically possible to induce time reversal in an interacting system of spins.

An analogue to Boltzmann's H for the spin system can be defined in terms of the distribution of spin states in the system. In the experiment, the spin system is initially perturbed into a non-equilibrium state (high H), and, as predicted by the H theorem the quantity H soon decreases to the equilibrium value. At some point, a carefully constructed electromagnetic pulse is applied that reverses the motions of all the spins. The spins then undo the time evolution from before the pulse, and after some time the H actually increases away from equilibrium (once the evolution has completely unwound, the H decreases once again to the minimum value). In some sense, the time reversed states noted by Loschmidt turned out to be not completely impractical.

=== Poincaré recurrence ===
In 1896, Ernst Zermelo noted a further problem with the H theorem, which was that if the system's H is at any time not a minimum, then by Poincaré recurrence, the non-minimal H must recur (though after some extremely long time). Boltzmann admitted that these recurring rises in H technically would occur, but pointed out that, over long times, the system spends only a tiny fraction of its time in one of these recurring states.

The second law of thermodynamics states that the entropy of an isolated system always increases to a maximum equilibrium value. This is strictly true only in the thermodynamic limit of an infinite number of particles. For a finite number of particles, there will always be entropy fluctuations. For example, in the fixed volume of the isolated system, the maximum entropy is obtained when half the particles are in one half of the volume, half in the other, but sometimes there will be temporarily a few more particles on one side than the other, and this will constitute a very small reduction in entropy. These entropy fluctuations are such that the longer one waits, the larger an entropy fluctuation one will probably see during that time, and the time one must wait for a given entropy fluctuation is always finite, even for a fluctuation to its minimum possible value. For example, one might have an extremely low entropy condition of all particles being in one half of the container. The gas will quickly attain its equilibrium value of entropy, but given enough time, this same situation will happen again. For practical systems, e.g. a gas in a 1-liter container at room temperature and atmospheric pressure, this time is truly enormous, many multiples of the age of the universe, and, practically speaking, one can ignore the possibility.

=== Fluctuations of H in small systems ===
Since H is a mechanically defined variable that is not conserved, then like any other such variable (pressure, etc.) it will show thermal fluctuations. This means that H regularly shows spontaneous increases from the minimum value. Technically this is not an exception to the H theorem, since the H theorem was only intended to apply for a gas with a very large number of particles. These fluctuations are only perceptible when the system is small and the time interval over which it is observed is not enormously large.

If H is interpreted as entropy as Boltzmann intended, then this can be seen as a manifestation of the fluctuation theorem.

== Connection to information theory ==
H is a forerunner of Shannon's information entropy. Claude Shannon denoted his measure of information entropy H after the H-theorem. The article on Shannon's information entropy contains an explanation of the discrete counterpart of the quantity H, known as the information entropy or information uncertainty (with a minus sign). By extending the discrete information entropy to the continuous information entropy, also called differential entropy, one obtains the expression in the equation from the section above, Definition and Meaning of Boltzmann's H, and thus a better feel for the meaning of H.

The H-theorem's connection between information and entropy plays a central role in a recent controversy called the Black hole information paradox.

== Tolman's H-theorem ==
Richard C. Tolman's 1938 book The Principles of Statistical Mechanics dedicates a whole chapter to the study of Boltzmann's H theorem, and its extension in the generalized classical statistical mechanics of Gibbs. A further chapter is devoted to the quantum mechanical version of the H-theorem.

=== Classical mechanical ===
We let q_{i} and p_{i} be our generalized canonical coordinates for a set of $r$ particles. Then we consider a function $f$ that returns the probability density of particles, over the states in phase space. Note how this can be multiplied by a small region in phase space, denoted by $\delta q_1 ... \delta p_r$, to yield the (average) expected number of particles in that region.

$$\delta n = f(q_1 ... p_r,t)\,\delta q_1\delta p_1 ... \delta q_r \delta p_r.\,$$

Tolman offers the following equations for the definition of the quantity H in Boltzmann's original H theorem.

$$H= \sum_i f_i \ln f_i \,\delta q_1 \cdots \delta p_r$$

Here we sum over the regions into which phase space is divided, indexed by $i$. And in the limit for an infinitesimal phase space volume $\delta q_i \rightarrow 0, \delta p_i \rightarrow 0 \; \forall \, i$, we can write the sum as an integral.

$$H= \int \cdots \int f \ln f \,d q_1 \cdots dp_r$$

H can also be written in terms of the number of molecules present in each of the cells.
$$\begin{align}
H & = \sum_i \left( n_i \ln n_i -  n_i \ln \delta v_\gamma\right) \\
& = \sum_i n_i \ln n_i + \text{constant}
\end{align}$$

An additional way to calculate the quantity H is:

$$H = -\ln P + \text{constant}\,$$

where P is the probability of finding a system chosen at random from the specified microcanonical ensemble. It can finally be written as:

$$H = -\ln G + \text{constant}\,$$

where G is the number of classical states.

The quantity H can also be defined as the integral over velocity space:

$$H \ \stackrel{\mathrm{def}}{=}\ \int { P(v) \ln P(v) \, d^3\mathbf{v}}
= \left\langle \ln P \right\rangle$$

1

where P(v) is the probability distribution.

Using the Boltzmann equation one can prove that H can only decrease.

For a system of N statistically independent particles, H is related to the thermodynamic entropy S through:

$$S \ \stackrel{\mathrm{def}}{=}\  - V k H + \text{constant}$$

So, according to the H-theorem, S can only increase.

=== Quantum mechanical ===
In quantum statistical mechanics (which is the quantum version of classical statistical mechanics), the H-function is the function:
$$H = \sum_i p_i \ln p_i, \,$$
where summation runs over all possible distinct states of the system, and p_{i} is the probability that the system could be found in the i-th state.

This is closely related to the entropy formula of Gibbs,
$$S = - k \sum_i p_i \ln p_i \;$$
and we shall (following e.g., Waldram (1985), p. 39) proceed using S rather than H.

First, differentiating with respect to time gives

$$\begin{align}
\frac{dS}{dt} & =  - k \sum_i \left(\frac{dp_i}{dt} \ln p_i  + \frac{dp_i}{dt}\right) \\
& =  - k \sum_i \frac{dp_i}{dt} \ln p_i  \\
\end{align}$$

(using the fact that $\sum_i dp_i/dt = 0$, since $\sum_i p_i = 1$, so the second term vanishes. We will see later that it will be useful to break this into two sums.)

Now Fermi's golden rule gives a master equation for the average rate of quantum jumps from state α to β; and from state β to α. (Of course, Fermi's golden rule itself makes certain approximations, and the introduction of this rule is what introduces irreversibility. It is essentially the quantum version of Boltzmann's Stosszahlansatz.) For an isolated system the jumps will make contributions
$$\begin{align}
\frac{dp_\alpha}{dt} & = \sum_\beta \nu_{\alpha\beta}(p_\beta - p_\alpha) \\
\frac{dp_\beta}{dt}  & = \sum_\alpha \nu_{\alpha\beta}(p_\alpha - p_\beta) \\
\end{align}$$
where the reversibility of the dynamics ensures that the same transition constant ν_{αβ} appears in both expressions.

So

$$\frac{dS}{dt} =  \frac{1}{2} k \sum_{ \alpha,\beta} \nu_{\alpha\beta}(\ln p_{\beta}-\ln p_{\alpha})(p_{\beta}- p_{\alpha}).$$

The two differences terms in the summation always have the same sign. For example:
$$w_{\beta} < w_{\alpha}$$

then

$$\ln w_{\beta} < \ln w_{\alpha}$$

so overall the two negative signs will cancel.

Therefore,

$$\Delta S \geq 0 \,$$

for an isolated system.

The same mathematics is sometimes used to show that relative entropy is a Lyapunov function of a Markov process in detailed balance, and other chemistry contexts.

== Gibbs' H-theorem ==
Evolution of an ensemble of classical systems in phase space (top). Each system consists of one massive particle in a one-dimensional potential well (red curve, lower figure). The initially compact ensemble becomes swirled up over time.

Josiah Willard Gibbs described another way in which the entropy of a microscopic system would tend to increase over time. Later writers have called this "Gibbs' H-theorem" as its conclusion resembles that of Boltzmann's. Gibbs himself never called it an H-theorem, and in fact his definition of entropy—and mechanism of increase—are very different from Boltzmann's. This section is included for historical completeness.

The setting of Gibbs' entropy production theorem is in ensemble statistical mechanics, and the entropy quantity is the Gibbs entropy (information entropy) defined in terms of the probability distribution for the entire state of the system. This is in contrast to Boltzmann's H defined in terms of the distribution of states of individual molecules, within a specific state of the system.

Gibbs considered the motion of an ensemble which initially starts out confined to a small region of phase space, meaning that the state of the system is known with fair precision though not quite exactly (low Gibbs entropy). The evolution of this ensemble over time proceeds according to Liouville's equation. For almost any kind of realistic system, the Liouville evolution tends to "stir" the ensemble over phase space, a process analogous to the mixing of a dye in an incompressible fluid. After some time, the ensemble appears to be spread out over phase space, although it is actually a finely striped pattern, with the total volume of the ensemble (and its Gibbs entropy) conserved. Liouville's equation is guaranteed to conserve Gibbs entropy since there is no random process acting on the system; in principle, the original ensemble can be recovered at any time by reversing the motion.

The critical point of the theorem is thus: If the fine structure in the stirred-up ensemble is very slightly blurred, for any reason, then the Gibbs entropy increases, and the ensemble becomes an equilibrium ensemble. As to why this blurring should occur in reality, there are a variety of suggested mechanisms. For example, one suggested mechanism is that the phase space is coarse-grained for some reason (analogous to the pixelization in the simulation of phase space shown in the figure). For any required finite degree of fineness the ensemble becomes "sensibly uniform" after a finite time. Or, if the system experiences a tiny uncontrolled interaction with its environment, the sharp coherence of the ensemble will be lost. Edwin Thompson Jaynes argued that the blurring is subjective in nature, simply corresponding to a loss of knowledge about the state of the system. In any case, however it occurs, the Gibbs entropy increase is irreversible provided the blurring cannot be reversed.

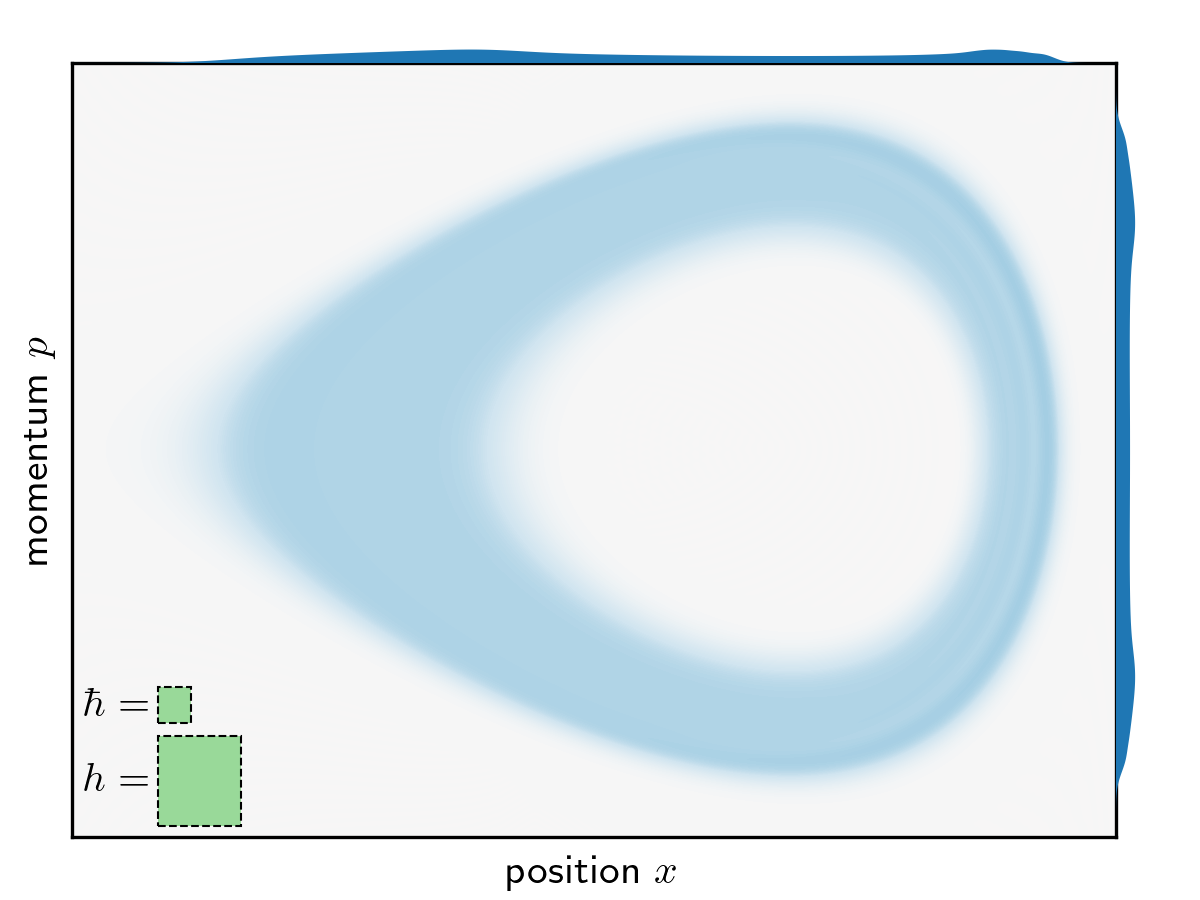
Quantum phase space dynamics in the same potential, visualized with the Wigner quasiprobability distribution. The lower image shows the equilibrated (time-averaged) distribution, with an entropy that is +1.37k higher.

The exactly evolving entropy, which does not increase, is known as fine-grained entropy. The blurred entropy is known as coarse-grained entropy. Leonard Susskind analogizes this distinction to the notion of the volume of a fibrous ball of cotton: On one hand the volume of the fibers themselves is constant, but in another sense there is a larger coarse-grained volume, corresponding to the outline of the ball.

Gibbs' entropy increase mechanism solves some of the technical difficulties found in Boltzmann's H-theorem: The Gibbs entropy does not fluctuate nor does it exhibit Poincare recurrence, and so the increase in Gibbs entropy, when it occurs, is therefore irreversible as expected from thermodynamics. The Gibbs mechanism also applies equally well to systems with very few degrees of freedom, such as the single-particle system shown in the figure. To the extent that one accepts that the ensemble becomes blurred, then, Gibbs' approach is a cleaner proof of the second law of thermodynamics.

Unfortunately, as pointed out early on in the development of quantum statistical mechanics by John von Neumann and others, this kind of argument does not carry over to quantum mechanics. In quantum mechanics, the ensemble cannot support an ever-finer mixing process, because of the finite dimensionality of the relevant portion of Hilbert space. Instead of converging closer and closer to the equilibrium ensemble (time-averaged ensemble) as in the classical case, the density matrix of the quantum system will constantly show evolution, even showing recurrences. Developing a quantum version of the H-theorem without appeal to the Stosszahlansatz is thus significantly more complicated.

== See also ==
- Boltzmann's entropy formula
- Loschmidt's paradox
- Arrow of time
- Second law of thermodynamics
- Fluctuation theorem
- Ehrenfest diffusion model
