= Kamni Potok =

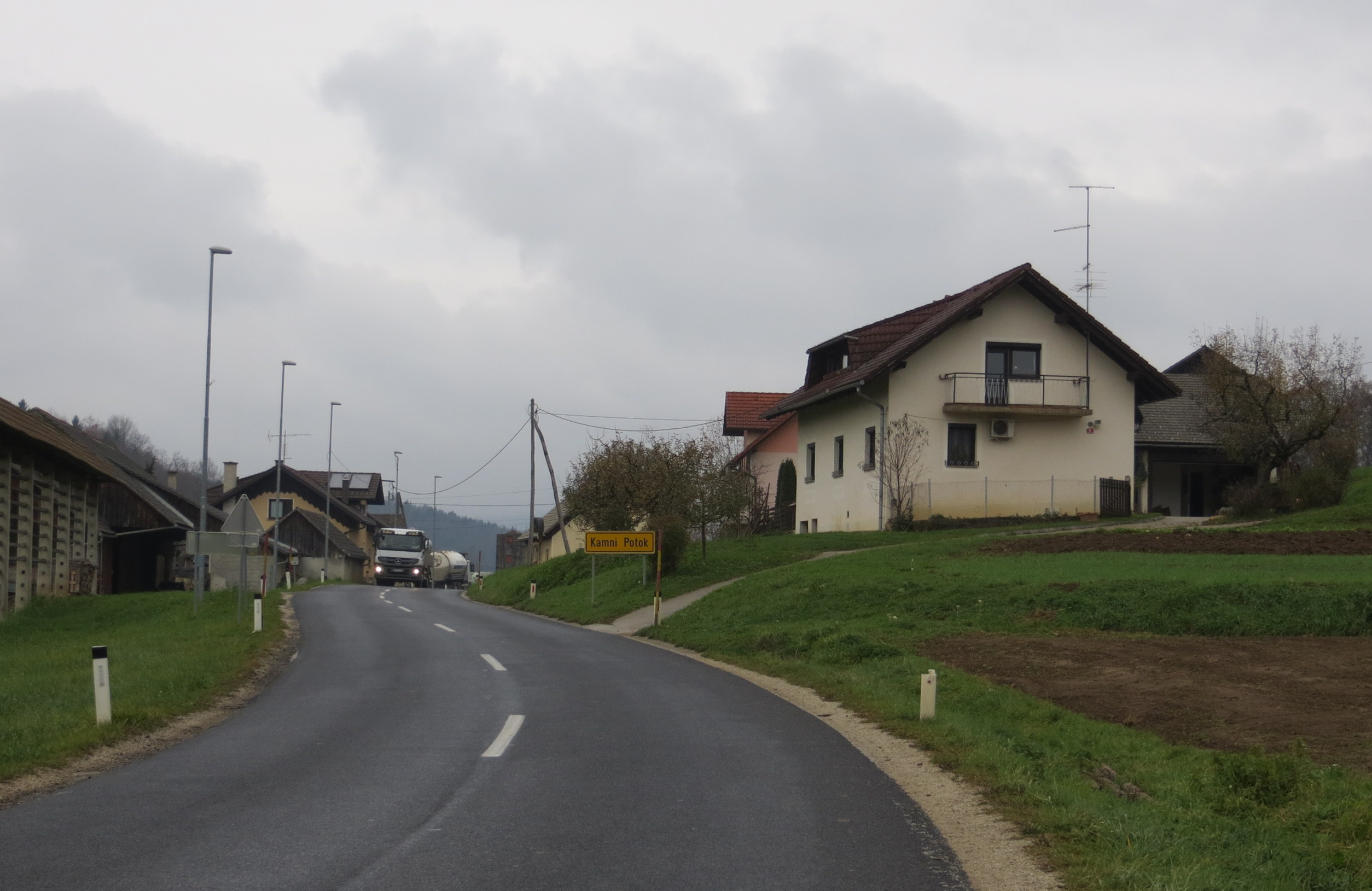

- Location in Slovenia
- Coordinates: 45°55′6.51″N 14°58′37.36″E
- Country: Slovenia
- Traditional region: Lower Carniola
- Statistical region: Southeast Slovenia
- Municipality: Trebnje

Area
  - Total: 0.72 km^{2} (0.28 sq mi)
- Elevation: 280.2 m (919 ft)

Population (2002)
  - Total: 75

Kamni Potok (pronounced [ˈkaːmni ˈpɔːtɔk]) is a settlement on the Temenica River in the Municipality of Trebnje in eastern Slovenia. The area is part of the historical region of Lower Carniola. The municipality is now included in the Southeast Slovenia Statistical Region.

Remains of a Roman-period burial ground, Roman road and water supply have been found at a site near the settlement.
