= Ignaz Schütz =

Ignaz Robert Schütz (1867, Březová (Moravia) – 1927, Brno) was a Czech–German mathematician and a physicist.

He studied at the Ludwig-Maximilians-Universität München where in 1894 he obtained a Ph.D in physics. Schütz was assistant to Ludwig Boltzmann at the Ludwig-Maximilians-Universität München from 1891 to 1894, the year of Boltzmann's departure from the Ludwig-Maximilians-Universität München. In 1897, Schütz, then a member of the Institute for Theoretical Physics at the University of Göttingen, showed how time translational symmetry induces conservation of energy.
