= Ludwig Boltzmann =

Austrian mathematician and theoretical physicist (1844–1906)

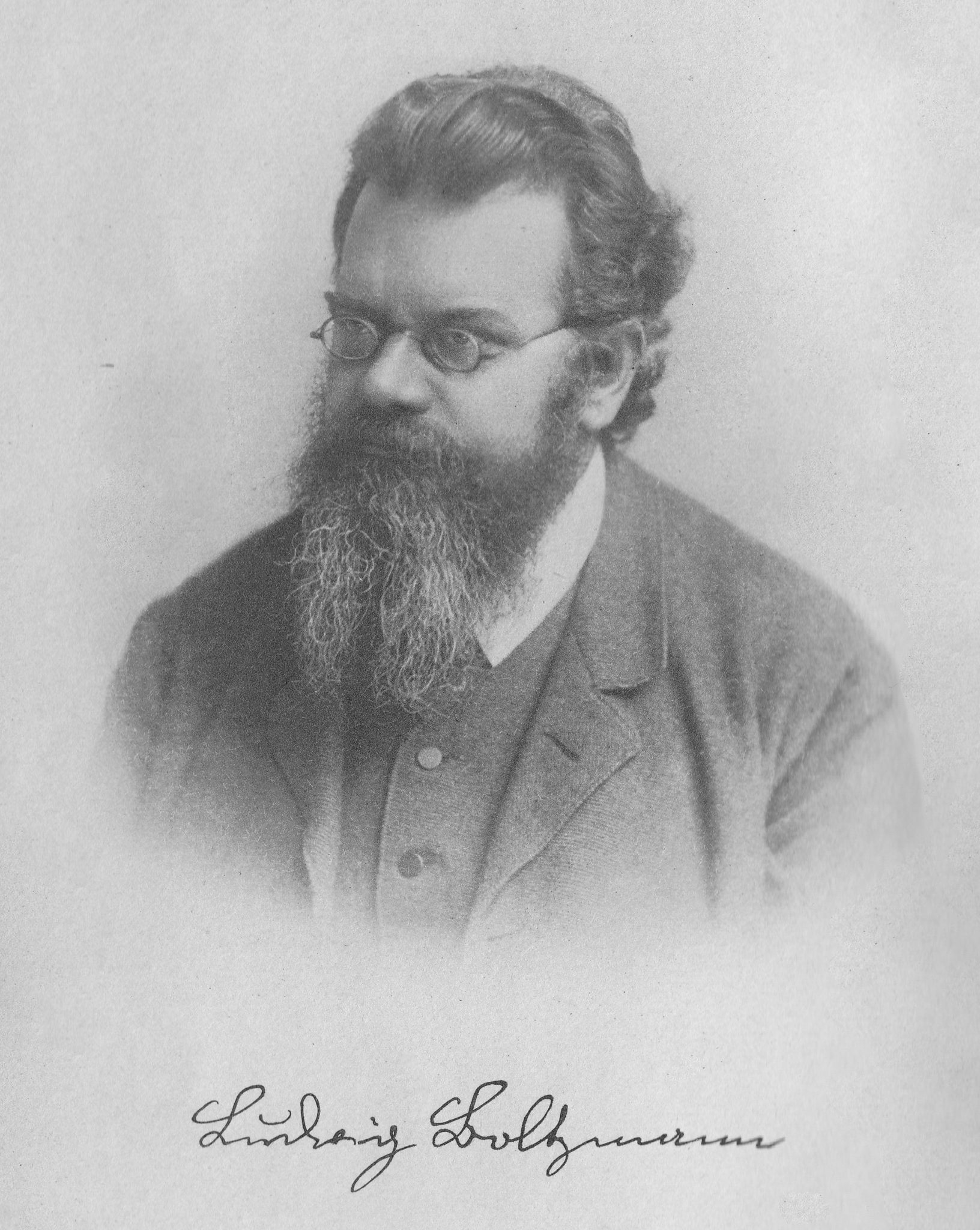
- Boltzmann in 1902
- Born: Ludwig Eduard Boltzmann; 20 February 1844; Vienna, Austria
- Died: 5 September 1906 (aged 62); Tybein, Austria-Hungary
- Resting place: Vienna Central Cemetery
- Education: University of Vienna (PhD, 1866; Dr. habil., 1869)
- Known for: Boltzmann distribution (1868); Boltzmann equation (1872); Introducing the H-theorem (1872); Boltzmann's entropy formula (1875); Expanding the equipartition theorem (1876); Describing canonical ensemble (1884); Stefan–Boltzmann law (1884)
- Spouse: Henriette von Aigentler (m. 1876)
- Children: 4
- Awards: ForMemRS (1899)
- Scientific career
- Fields: Statistical physics; Thermodynamics
- Workplaces: University of Graz (1869–1873, 1876–1890); University of Vienna (1873–1876, 1894–1900, 1902–1906); Ludwig-Maximilians-Universität München (1890–1894); Leipzig University (1900–1902)
- Thesis: Über die mechanische Bedeutung des zweiten Hauptsatzes der mechanischen Wärmetheorie (1866)
- Doctoral advisor: Josef Stefan
- Doctoral students: Ignaz Schütz (1894); Paul Ehrenfest (1904); Philipp Frank (1907)
- Other notable students: Svante Arrhenius; Gustav Herglotz; Lise Meitner; Walther Nernst; Karl Přibram

Ludwig Eduard Boltzmann (/ˈbɔːltsˌmɑːn/ BAWLTS-mahn or /ˈboʊltsmən/ BOHLTS-muhn; German: [ˈluːtvɪç ˈeːduaʁt ˈbɔltsman]; 20 February 1844 – 5 September 1906) was an Austrian mathematician and theoretical physicist. His greatest achievements were the development of statistical mechanics and the statistical explanation of the second law of thermodynamics. In 1877, he provided the current definition of entropy, $S = k_{\rm B} \ln \Omega$, where Ω is the number of microstates whose energy equals the system's energy, interpreted as a measure of the statistical disorder of a system. Max Planck named the constant k_{B} the Boltzmann constant.

Statistical mechanics is one of the pillars of modern physics. It describes how macroscopic observations (such as temperature and pressure) are related to microscopic parameters that fluctuate around an average. It connects thermodynamic quantities (such as heat capacity) to microscopic behavior, whereas, in classical thermodynamics, the only available option would be to measure and tabulate such quantities for various materials.

== Biography ==
=== Childhood and education ===
Boltzmann was born in Erdberg, a suburb of Vienna, into a Catholic family. His father, Ludwig Georg Boltzmann, was a revenue official. His grandfather, who had moved to Vienna from Berlin, was a clock manufacturer, and Boltzmann's mother, Katharina Pauernfeind, was originally from Salzburg. Boltzmann was home-schooled until the age of ten, and then attended high school in Linz, Upper Austria. When Boltzmann was 15, his father died.

Starting in 1863, Boltzmann studied mathematics and physics at the University of Vienna. He received his doctorate in 1866 and his venia legendi in 1869. Boltzmann worked closely with Josef Stefan, director of the institute of physics. It was Stefan who introduced Boltzmann to James Clerk Maxwell's work.

=== Academic career ===
In 1869, at age 25, thanks to a letter of recommendation written by Josef Stefan, Boltzmann was appointed full Professor of Mathematical Physics at the University of Graz in the province of Styria. In 1869, he spent several months in Heidelberg working with Robert Bunsen and Leo Königsberger and in 1871 with Gustav Kirchhoff and Hermann von Helmholtz in Berlin. In 1873, Boltzmann joined the University of Vienna as Professor of Mathematics and there he stayed until 1876.

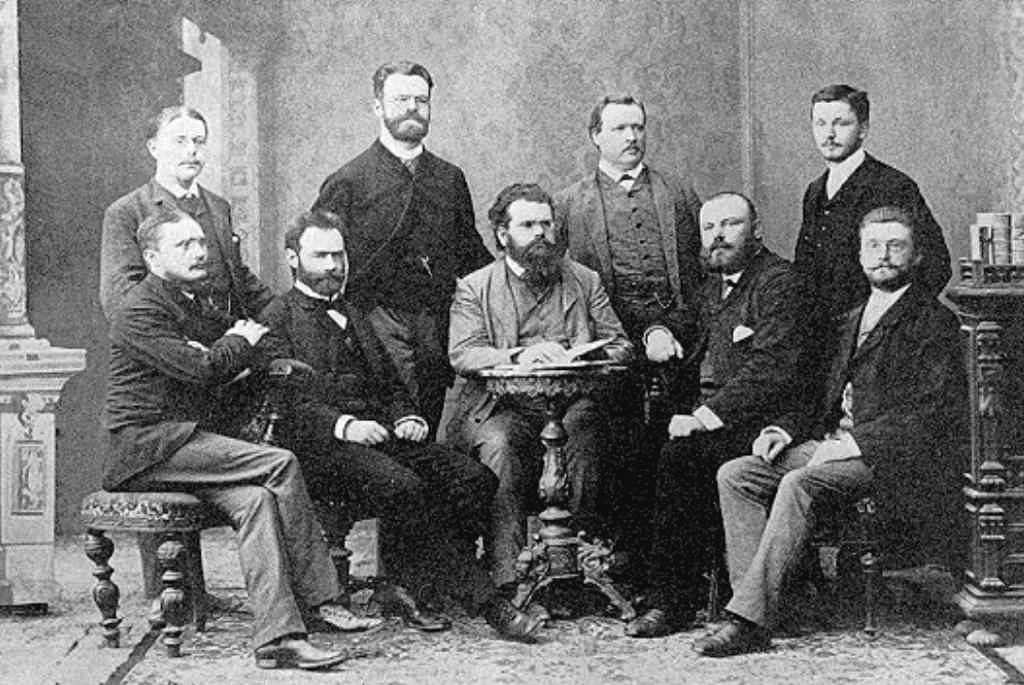
Ludwig Boltzmann and co-workers in Graz, 1887: (standing, from the left) Nernst, Streintz, Arrhenius, Hiecke, (sitting, from the left) Aulinger, Ettingshausen, Boltzmann, Klemenčič, Hausmanninger

In 1872, long before women were admitted to Austrian universities, he met Henriette von Aigentler, an aspiring teacher of mathematics and physics in Graz. Her nieces were Slovenian painters Avgusta Šantel and Henrika Šantel. Henriette was refused permission to audit lectures unofficially. Boltzmann supported her decision to appeal, which was successful. On 17 July 1876 Ludwig Boltzmann married Henriette; they had three daughters: Henriette (1880), Ida (1884) and Else (1891); and a son, Arthur Ludwig (1881). Boltzmann went back to Graz to take up the chair of Experimental Physics. Among his students in Graz were Svante Arrhenius and Walther Nernst. He spent 14 happy years in Graz and it was there that he developed his statistical concept of nature.

Boltzmann was appointed to the Chair of Theoretical Physics at the Ludwig-Maximilians-Universität München in Bavaria, Germany in 1890.

In 1894, Boltzmann succeeded his teacher Joseph Stefan as Professor of Theoretical Physics at the University of Vienna.

=== Final years and death ===
Boltzmann spent a great deal of effort in his final years defending his theories. He did not get along with some of his colleagues in Vienna, particularly Ernst Mach, who became a professor of philosophy and history of sciences in 1895. That same year Georg Helm and Wilhelm Ostwald presented their position on energetics at a meeting in Lübeck. They saw energy, and not matter, as the chief component of the universe. Boltzmann's position carried the day among other physicists who supported his atomic theories in the debate. In 1900, Boltzmann went to Leipzig University, on the invitation of Wilhelm Ostwald. Ostwald offered Boltzmann the professorial chair in physics, which became vacant when Gustav Heinrich Wiedemann died.

After Mach retired due to bad health, in 1902 Boltzmann returned to Vienna. In addition to his lectures on physics, in 1903 Boltzmann started teaching the philosophy course (which had previously been given by Mach). Boltzmann's lectures on natural philosophy were very popular and received considerable attention. His first lecture was an enormous success: people stood all the way down the staircase outside the largest available lecture hall, and the Emperor invited him to a reception. Also in 1903, Boltzmann, together with Gustav von Escherich and Emil Müller, founded the Austrian Mathematical Society. His students included Karl Přibram, Paul Ehrenfest and Lise Meitner.

In 1905, he gave an invited course of lectures in the summer session at the University of California, Berkeley, which he described in a popular essay A German professor's trip to El Dorado.

In May 1906, Boltzmann's deteriorating mental condition (described in a letter by the Dean as "a serious form of neurasthenia") forced him to resign his position. His symptoms indicate he experienced what might today be diagnosed as bipolar disorder. Four months later he died by suicide on 5 September 1906, by hanging himself while on vacation with his wife and daughter in Duino, near Trieste (then Austria). He is buried in the Viennese Zentralfriedhof. His tombstone bears the inscription of Boltzmann's entropy formula: $S = k \cdot \log W$.

== Philosophy ==
Boltzmann's kinetic theory of gases seemed to presuppose the reality of atoms and molecules, but many German philosophers and scientists like Ernst Mach and the physical chemist Wilhelm Ostwald disbelieved their existence. Boltzmann had been exposed to molecular theory by James Clerk Maxwell’s paper, "Illustrations of the Dynamical Theory of Gases," which described temperature as dependent on the speed of the molecules. This inspired Boltzmann to embrace atomism, introducing statistics into physics and extending the theory.

Boltzmann wrote treatises on philosophy such as "On the question of the objective existence of processes in inanimate nature" (1897). He was a realist. In his work "On Thesis of Schopenhauer's", Boltzmann refers to his philosophy as materialism and says further: "Idealism asserts that only the ego exists, the various ideas, and seeks to explain matter from them. Materialism starts from the existence of matter and seeks to explain sensations from it."

== Physics ==
Boltzmann's most important scientific contributions were in the kinetic theory of gases based upon the second law of thermodynamics. This was important because Newtonian mechanics did not differentiate between past and future motion, but Rudolf Clausius’ invention of entropy to describe the second law was based on disgregation or dispersion at the molecular level so that the future was one-directional. Boltzmann was twenty-five years of age when he came upon James Clerk Maxwell's work on the kinetic theory of gases which hypothesized that temperature was caused by collision of molecules. Maxwell used statistics to create a curve of molecular kinetic energy distribution from which Boltzmann clarified and developed the ideas of kinetic theory and entropy based upon statistical atomic theory, creating the Maxwell–Boltzmann distribution as a description of molecular speeds in a gas. It was Boltzmann who derived the first equation to model the dynamic evolution of the probability distribution Maxwell and he had created. Boltzmann's key insight was that dispersion occurred due to the statistical probability of increased molecular "states". Boltzmann went beyond Maxwell by applying his distribution equation to not solely gases, but also liquids and solids. Boltzmann also extended his theory in his 1877 paper beyond Carnot, Rudolf Clausius, James Clerk Maxwell and Lord Kelvin by demonstrating that entropy is contributed to by heat, spatial separation, and radiation. Maxwell–Boltzmann statistics and the Boltzmann distribution remain central in the foundations of classical statistical mechanics. They are also applicable to other phenomena that do not require quantum statistics and provide insight into the meaning of temperature.

He made multiple attempts to explain the second law of thermodynamics, with the attempts ranging over many areas. He tried Helmholtz's monocycle model, a pure ensemble approach like Gibbs, a pure mechanical approach like ergodic theory, the combinatorial argument, the Stoßzahlansatz, etc.

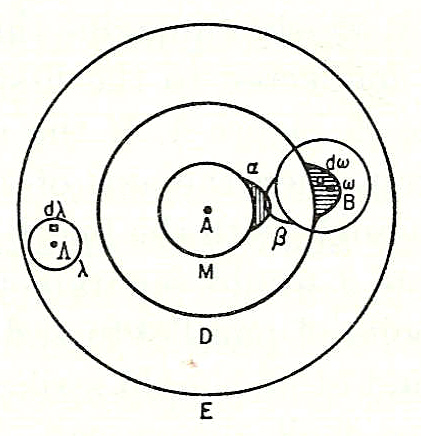
Boltzmann's 1898 I_{2} molecule diagram showing atomic "sensitive region" (α, β) overlap

Most chemists, since the discoveries of John Dalton in 1808, and James Clerk Maxwell in Scotland and Josiah Willard Gibbs in the United States, shared Boltzmann's belief in atoms and molecules, but much of the physics establishment did not share this belief until decades later. Boltzmann had a long-running dispute with the editor of the preeminent German physics journal of his day, who refused to let Boltzmann refer to atoms and molecules as anything other than convenient theoretical constructs. Only a couple of years after Boltzmann's death, Perrin's studies of colloidal suspensions (1908–1909), based on Einstein's theoretical studies of 1905, confirmed the values of the Avogadro constant and the Boltzmann constant, convincing the world that the tiny particles really exist.

To quote Planck, "The logarithmic connection between entropy and probability was first stated by L. Boltzmann in his kinetic theory of gases". This famous formula for entropy S is
$$S = k_{\mathrm{B}} \ln W$$
where k_{B} is the Boltzmann constant, and ln is the natural logarithm. W (for Wahrscheinlichkeit, a German word meaning "probability") is the probability of occurrence of a macrostate or, more precisely, the number of possible microstates corresponding to the macroscopic state of a system – the number of (unobservable) "ways" in the (observable) thermodynamic state of a system that can be realized by assigning different positions and momenta to the various molecules. Boltzmann's paradigm was an ideal gas of N identical particles, of which N_{i} are in the ith microscopic condition (range) of position and momentum. W can be counted using the formula for permutations
$$W = N! \prod_i \frac{1}{N_i!}$$
where i ranges over all possible molecular conditions, and where $!$ denotes factorial. The "correction" in the denominator account for indistinguishable particles in the same condition.

Boltzmann could also be considered one of the forerunners of quantum mechanics due to his suggestion in 1877 that the energy levels of a physical system could be discrete, although Boltzmann used this as a mathematical device with no physical meaning.

An alternative to Boltzmann's formula for entropy, above, is the information entropy definition introduced in 1948 by Claude Shannon. Shannon's definition was intended for use in communication theory but is applicable in all areas. It reduces to Boltzmann's expression when all the probabilities are equal, but can, of course, be used when they are not. Its virtue is that it yields immediate results without resorting to factorials or Stirling's approximation. Similar formulas are found, however, as far back as the work of Boltzmann, and explicitly in Gibbs (see reference).

== Boltzmann equation ==
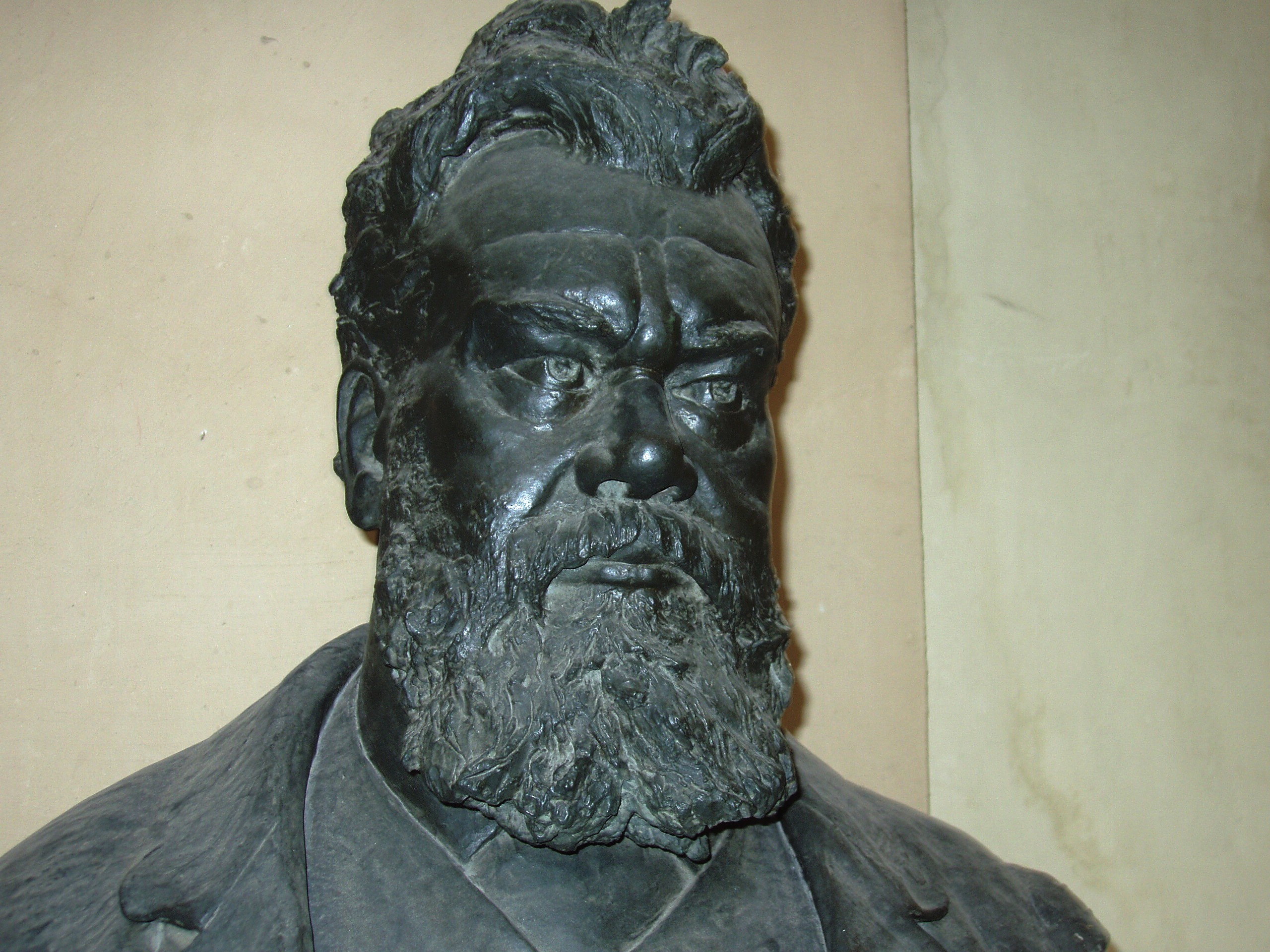
Boltzmann's bust in the courtyard arcade of the main building, University of Vienna

The Boltzmann equation was developed to describe the dynamics of an ideal gas.
$$\frac{\partial f}{\partial t}+ v \frac{\partial f}{\partial x}+ \frac{F}{m} \frac{\partial f}{\partial v} = \frac{\partial f}{\partial t}\left.{\!\!\frac{}{}}\right|_\mathrm{collision}$$
where ƒ represents the distribution function of single-particle position and momentum at a given time (see the Maxwell–Boltzmann distribution), F is a force, m is the mass of a particle, t is the time and v is an average velocity of particles.

This equation describes the temporal and spatial variation of the probability distribution for the position and momentum of a density distribution of a cloud of points in single-particle phase space. (See Hamiltonian mechanics.) The first term on the left-hand side represents the explicit time variation of the distribution function, while the second term gives the spatial variation, and the third term describes the effect of any force acting on the particles. The right-hand side of the equation represents the effect of collisions.

In principle, the above equation completely describes the dynamics of an ensemble of gas particles, given appropriate boundary conditions. This first-order differential equation has a deceptively simple appearance, since f can represent an arbitrary single-particle distribution function. Also, the force acting on the particles depends directly on the velocity distribution function f. The Boltzmann equation is notoriously difficult to integrate. David Hilbert spent years trying to solve it without any real success.

The form of the collision term assumed by Boltzmann was approximate. However, for an ideal gas the standard Chapman–Enskog solution of the Boltzmann equation is highly accurate. It is expected to lead to incorrect results for an ideal gas only under shock wave conditions.

Boltzmann tried for many years to "prove" the second law of thermodynamics using his gas-dynamical equation – his famous H-theorem. However the key assumption he made in formulating the collision term was "molecular chaos", an assumption which breaks time-reversal symmetry as is necessary for anything which could imply the second law. It was from the probabilistic assumption alone that Boltzmann's apparent success emanated, so his long dispute with Loschmidt and others over Loschmidt's paradox ultimately ended in his failure.

Finally, in the 1970s E. G. D. Cohen and J. R. Dorfman proved that a systematic (power series) extension of the Boltzmann equation to high densities is mathematically impossible. Consequently, nonequilibrium statistical mechanics for dense gases and liquids focuses on the Green–Kubo relations, the fluctuation theorem, and other approaches instead.

== Second thermodynamics law as a law of disorder ==
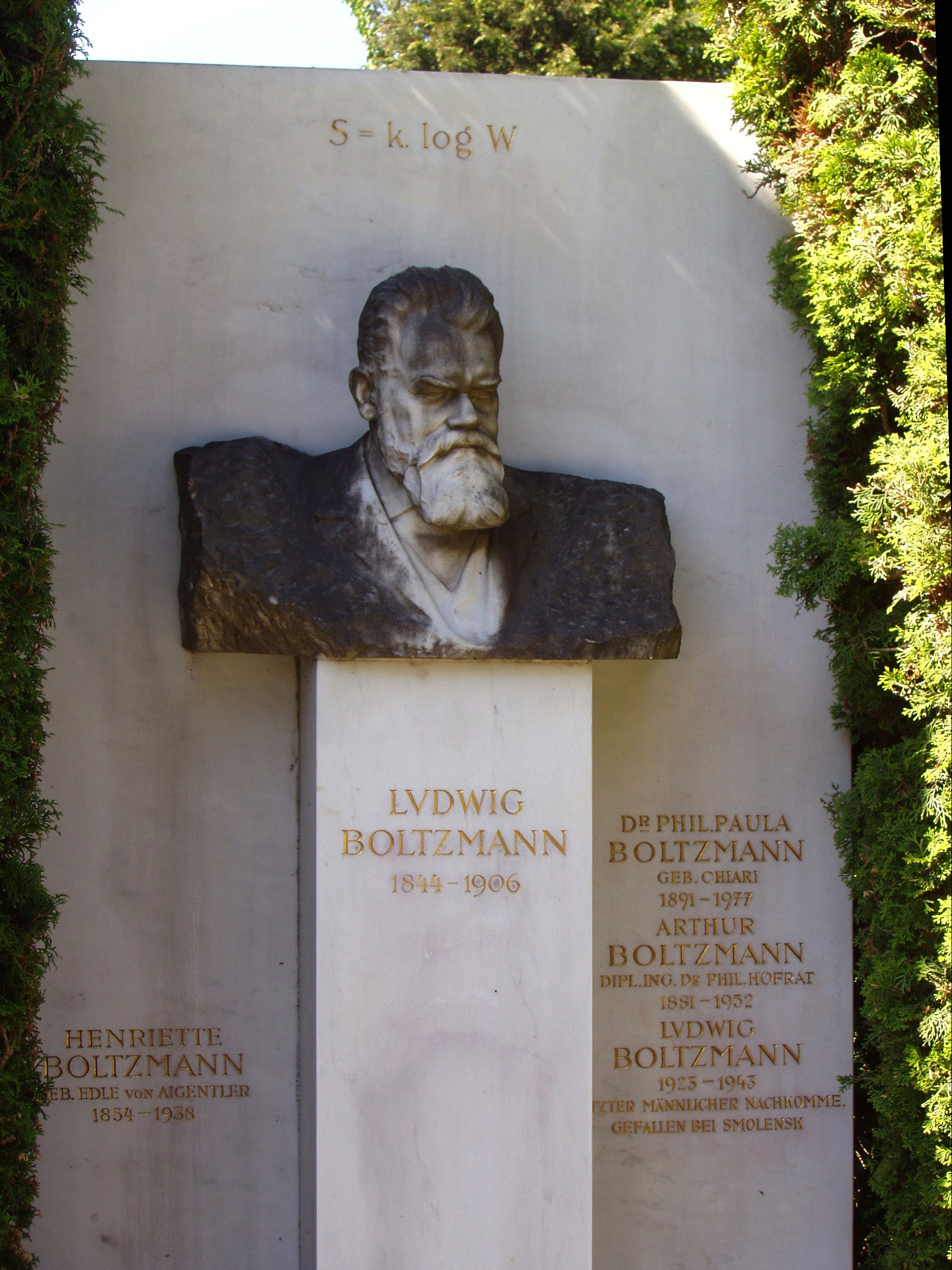
Boltzmann's grave in the Zentralfriedhof, Vienna, with bust and entropy formula

The idea that the second law of thermodynamics or "entropy law" is a law of disorder (or that dynamically ordered states are "infinitely improbable") is due to Boltzmann's view of the second law of thermodynamics.

In particular, it was Boltzmann's attempt to reduce it to a stochastic collision function, or law of probability following from the random collisions of mechanical particles. Following Maxwell, Boltzmann modeled gas molecules as colliding billiard balls in a box, noting that with each collision nonequilibrium velocity distributions (groups of molecules moving at the same speed and in the same direction) would become increasingly disordered leading to a final state of macroscopic uniformity and maximum microscopic disorder or the state of maximum entropy (where the macroscopic uniformity corresponds to the obliteration of all field potentials or gradients). The second law, he argued, was thus simply the result of the fact that in a world of mechanically colliding particles disordered states are the most probable. Because there are so many more possible disordered states than ordered ones, a system will almost always be found either in the state of maximum disorder – the macrostate with the greatest number of accessible microstates such as a gas in a box at equilibrium – or moving towards it. A dynamically ordered state, one with molecules moving "at the same speed and in the same direction", Boltzmann concluded, is thus "the most improbable case conceivable...an infinitely improbable configuration of energy."

Boltzmann accomplished the feat of showing that the second law of thermodynamics is only a statistical fact. The gradual disordering of energy is analogous to the disordering of an initially ordered pack of cards under repeated shuffling, and just as the cards will finally return to their original order if shuffled a gigantic number of times, so the entire universe must some-day regain, by pure chance, the state from which it first set out. (This optimistic coda to the idea of the dying universe becomes somewhat muted when one attempts to estimate the timeline which will probably elapse before it spontaneously occurs.) The tendency for entropy increase seems to cause difficulty to beginners in thermodynamics, but is easy to understand from the standpoint of the theory of probability. Consider two ordinary dice, with both sixes face up. After the dice are shaken, the chance of finding these two sixes face up is small (1 in 36); thus one can say that the random motion (the agitation) of the dice, like the chaotic collisions of molecules because of thermal energy, causes the less probable state to change to one that is more probable. With millions of dice, like the millions of atoms involved in thermodynamic calculations, the probability of their all being sixes becomes so vanishingly small that the system must move to one of the more probable states.

== Legacy and impact on modern science ==
Ludwig Boltzmann's contributions to physics and philosophy have left a lasting impact on modern science. His pioneering work in statistical mechanics and thermodynamics laid the foundation for some of the most fundamental concepts in physics. For instance, Max Planck in quantizing resonators in his Black Body theory of radiation used the Boltzmann constant to describe the entropy of the system to arrive at his formula in 1900. However, Boltzmann's work was not always readily accepted during his lifetime, and he faced opposition from some of his contemporaries, particularly in regard to the existence of atoms and molecules. Nevertheless, the validity and importance of his ideas were eventually recognized, and they have since become cornerstones of modern physics.

=== Atomic theory and the existence of atoms and molecules ===
Boltzmann's kinetic theory of gases was one of the first attempts to explain macroscopic properties, such as pressure and temperature, in terms of the behaviour of individual atoms and molecules. Although many chemists were already accepting the existence of atoms and molecules, the broader physics community took some time to embrace this view. Boltzmann's long-running dispute with the editor of a prominent German physics journal over the acceptance of atoms and molecules underscores the initial resistance to this idea.

It was only after experiments (including Jean Perrin's studies of colloidal suspensions) confirmed the values of the Avogadro constant and the Boltzmann constant that the existence of atoms and molecules gained wider acceptance. Boltzmann's kinetic theory played a crucial role in demonstrating the reality of atoms and molecules and explaining various phenomena in gases, liquids, and solids.

=== Statistical mechanics and the Boltzmann constant ===
Statistical mechanics, which Boltzmann pioneered, connects macroscopic observations with microscopic behaviors. His statistical explanation of the second law of thermodynamics was a significant achievement, and he provided the current definition of entropy ($S = k_{\rm B} \ln \Omega$), where k_{B} is the Boltzmann constant and Ω is the number of microstates corresponding to a given macrostate.

Max Planck later named the constant k_{B} as the Boltzmann constant in honor of Boltzmann's contributions to statistical mechanics. The Boltzmann constant is now a fundamental constant in physics and across many scientific disciplines.

=== Boltzmann equation and modern uses ===
Because the Boltzmann equation is practical in solving problems in rarefied or dilute gases, it has been used in many diverse areas of technology. It has been used to calculate Space Shuttle re-entry in the upper atmosphere. It is the basis for neutron transport theory, and ion transport in semiconductors.

== Influence on quantum mechanics ==
Boltzmann's work in statistical mechanics laid the groundwork for understanding the statistical behavior of particles in systems with a large number of degrees of freedom. His 1877 paper on the kinetic theory of heat used discrete energy levels of physical systems as a mathematical device, and went on to show that the same approach could be applied to continuous systems. This might be seen as a forerunner to the development of quantum mechanics. One biographer of Boltzmann says that Boltzmann’s approach “pav[ed] the way for Planck.”

Quantization of energy levels became a fundamental postulate in quantum mechanics, leading to groundbreaking theories like quantum electrodynamics and quantum field theory. Thus, Boltzmann's early insights into the quantization of energy levels had a profound influence on the development of quantum physics.

== Awards and honours ==
In 1885, he became a member of the Imperial Austrian Academy of Sciences and in 1887 he became the President of the University of Graz. He was elected a member of the Royal Swedish Academy of Sciences in 1888 and a Foreign Member of the Royal Society (ForMemRS) in 1899. He was awarded honorary membership of the Manchester Literary and Philosophical Society in 1892. Numerous things are named in his honour.

== Works ==
- Verhältniss zur Fernwirkungstheorie, Specielle Fälle der Elektrostatik, stationären Strömung und Induction (in German). Vol. 2. Leipzig: Johann Ambrosius Barth. 1893.
- Theorie van der Waals, Gase mit zusammengesetzten Molekülen, Gasdissociation, Schlussbemerkungen (in German). Vol. 2. Leipzig: Johann Ambrosius Barth. 1896.
- Theorie der Gase mit einatomigen Molekülen, deren Dimensionen gegen die mittlere Weglänge verschwinden (in German). Vol. 1. Leipzig: Johann Ambrosius Barth. 1896.
- Abteilung der Grundgleichungen für ruhende, homogene, isotrope Körper (in German). Vol. 1. Leipzig: Johann Ambrosius Barth. 1908.
- Vorlesungen über Gastheorie (in French). Paris: Gauthier-Villars. 1922.
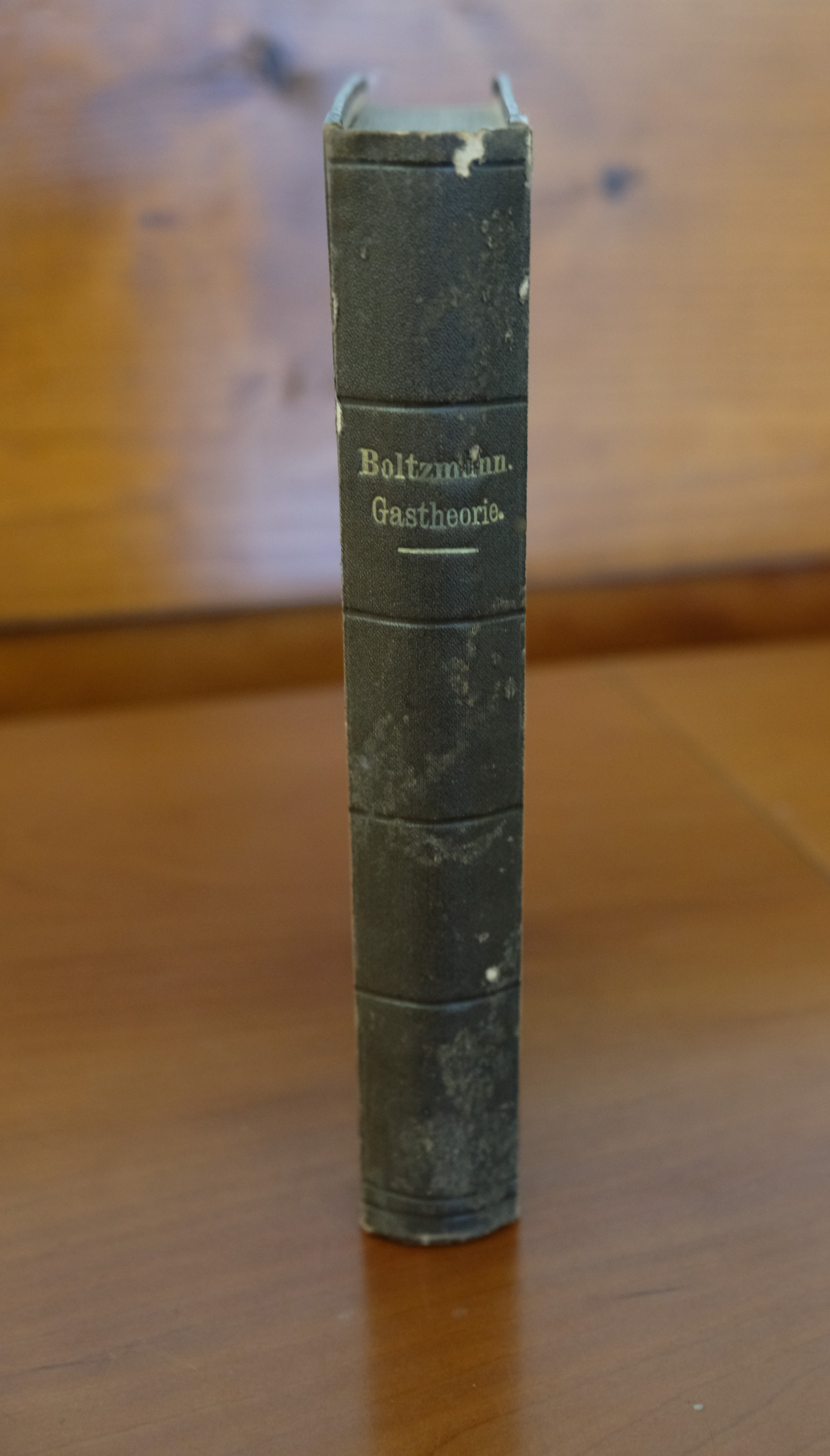
Volumes I and II of Vorlesungen über Gastheorie (1896-1898)

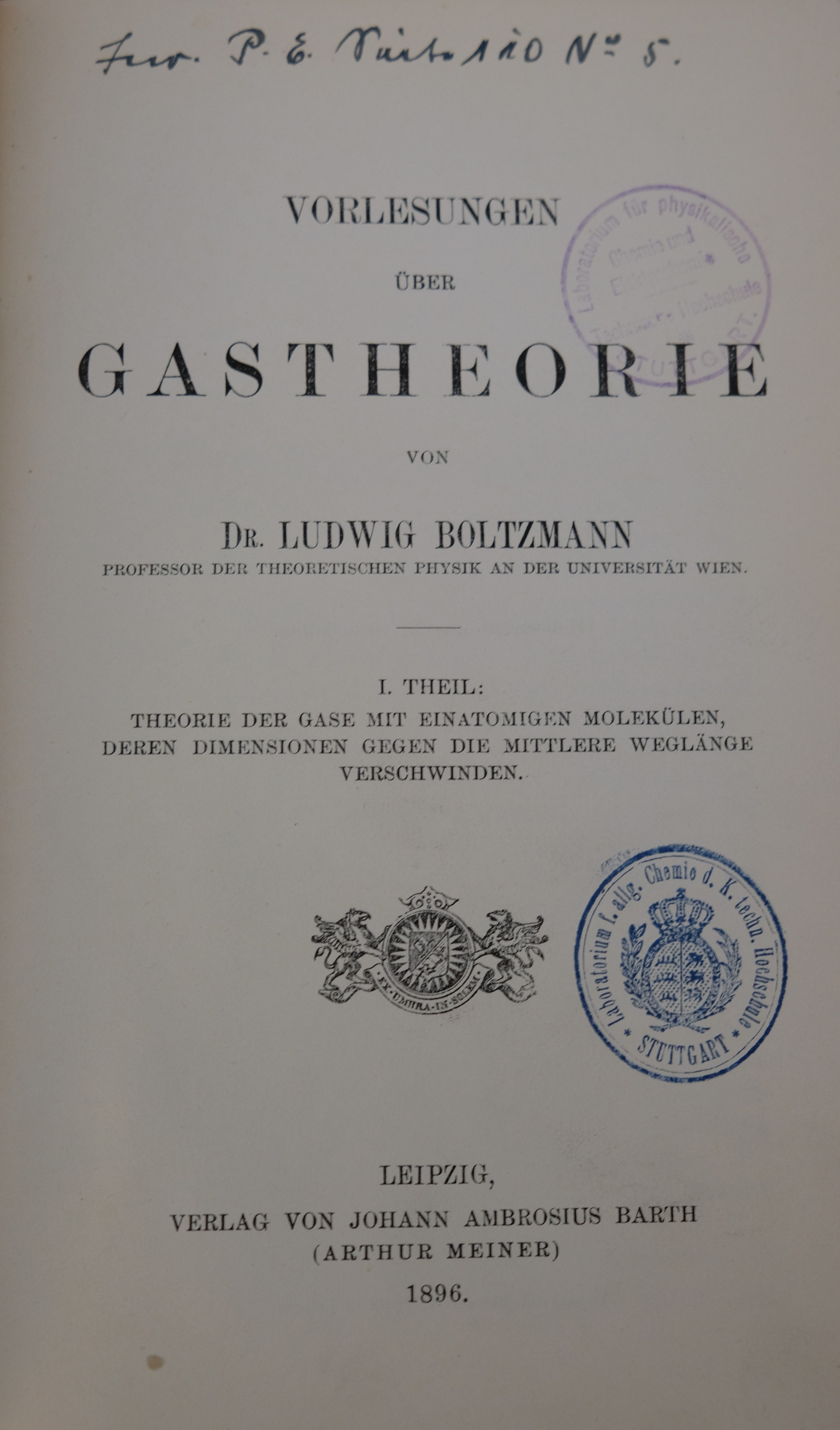
Title page to volumes I and II of Vorlesungen über Gastheorie (1896-1898)

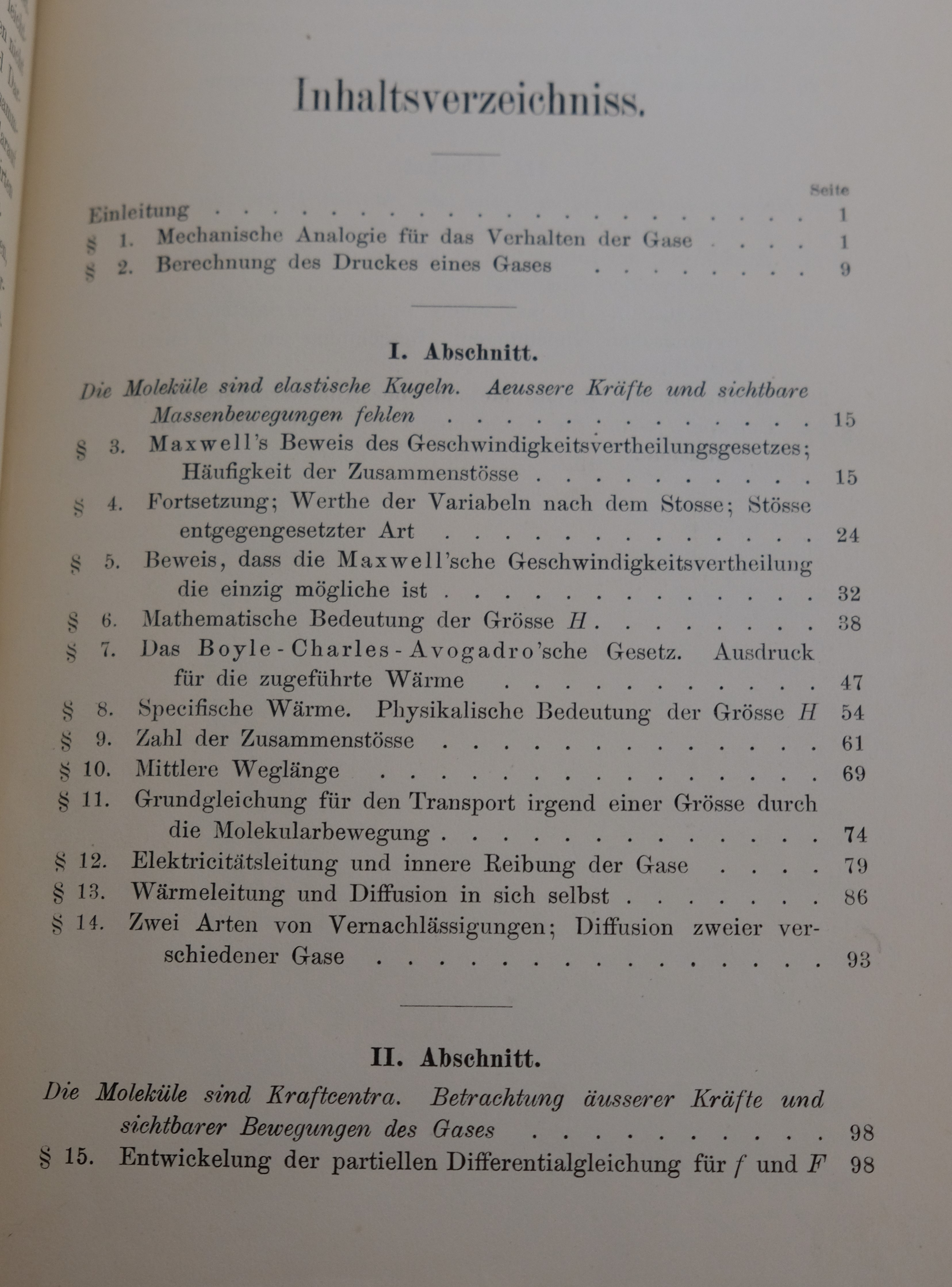
Table of contents to volumes I and II of Vorlesungen über Gastheorie (1896-1898)

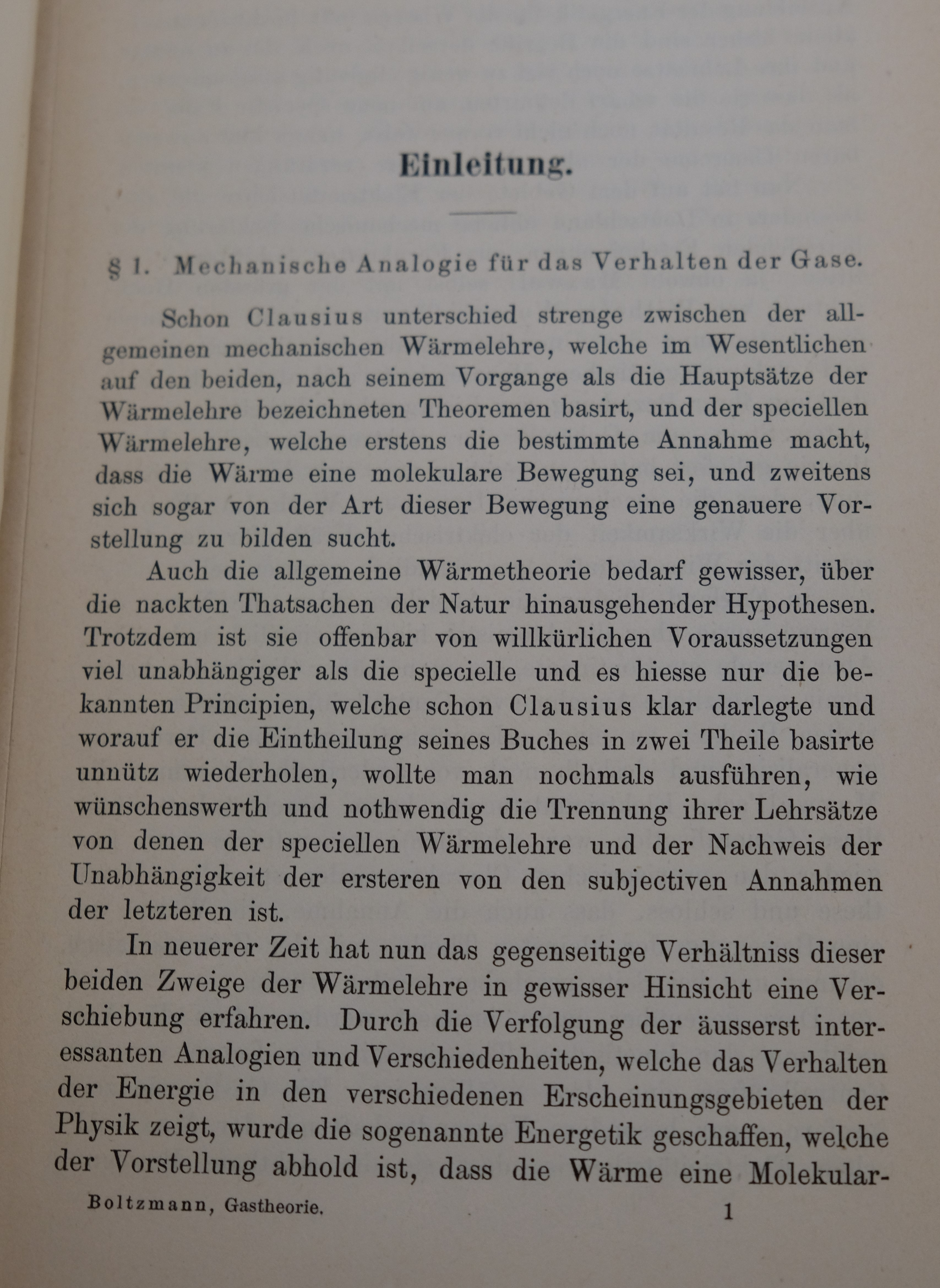
Introduction to volumes I and II of Vorlesungen über Gastheorie (1896-1898)
