= Georg Helm =

German mathematician

- Born: March 15, 1851; Dresden, Kingdom of Saxony
- Died: September 12, 1923 (aged 72); Dresden, Kingdom of Saxony
- Known for: Energetics
- Scientific career
- Fields: Mathematical chemistry
- Institutions: Dresden University of Technology

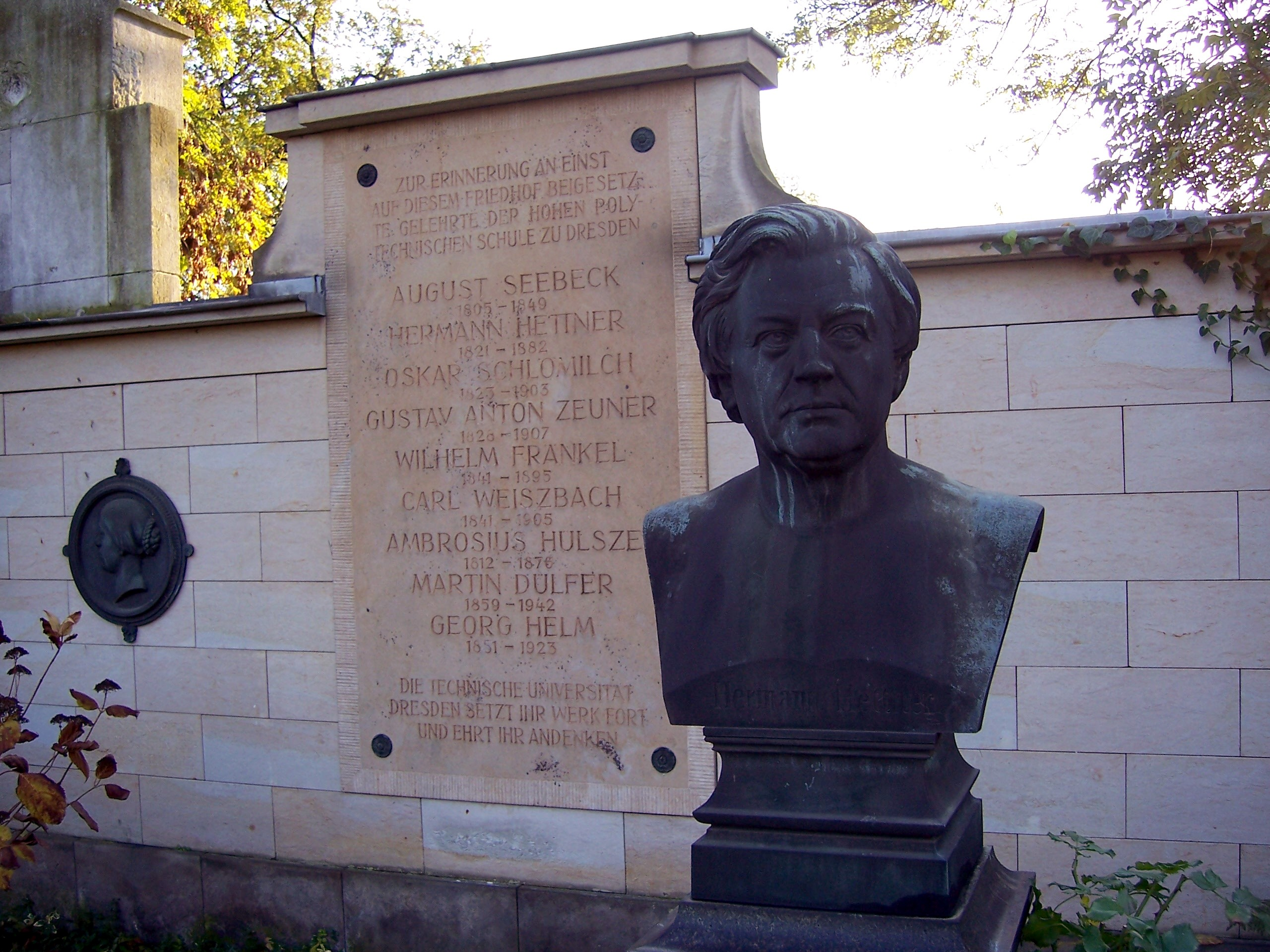
Memorial Tablet to Georg Helm at the old Annenfriedhof in Dresden (Bust is of Hermann Hettner).

Georg Ferdinand Helm (15 March 1851 – 13 September 1923) was a German mathematician.

Helm graduated from high school from the Annenschule in Dresden in 1867. Thereafter he studied mathematics and natural sciences at the Dresden Polytechnical School, and then at the universities of Leipzig and Berlin from 1871 to 1873.

Helm first taught at the Annenschule, his high school alma mater. Then he taught mathematics and physics at the Royal Saxon Polytechnic (now TU Dresden) from 1888 until 1922. He was an interdisciplinarian, whose teaching responsibilities included a seminar on insurance statistics. Helm coined the term “mathematical chemistry”, and was the first to classify physical and chemical properties as intensive or extensive in 1898.

His work in the area of economics postulated that money was the economic equivalent of the lowest form of social entropy as described in his work “Teachings on Energy” (in German, Lehre von der Energie, 1887).

== Selected works ==
- Lehre von der Energie (Leipzig, 1887)
- Grundzüge der mathematischen Chemie (1894)
  - The principles of mathematical chemistry: The energetics of chemical phenomena (New York, 1897)
- Die Energetik (Leipzig, 1898)
- Die Theorien der Elektrodynamik nach ihrer geschichtlichen Entwicklung (Leipzig, 1904)
- Die Grundlehren der höheren Mathematik (Leipzig, 1910)
