= Boltzmann (crater) =

Lunar impact crater

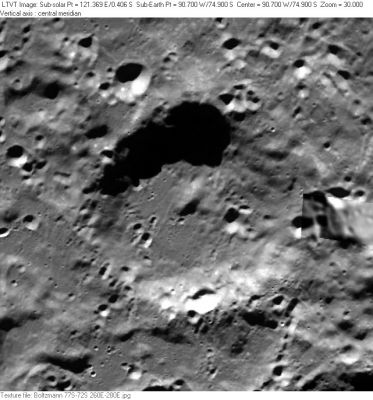
- Clementine mosaic
- Coordinates: 74.9°S 90.7°W
- Diameter: 72.31 km (44.93 mi)
- Depth: Unknown
- Colongitude: 95° at sunrise
- Eponym: Ludwig Boltzmann

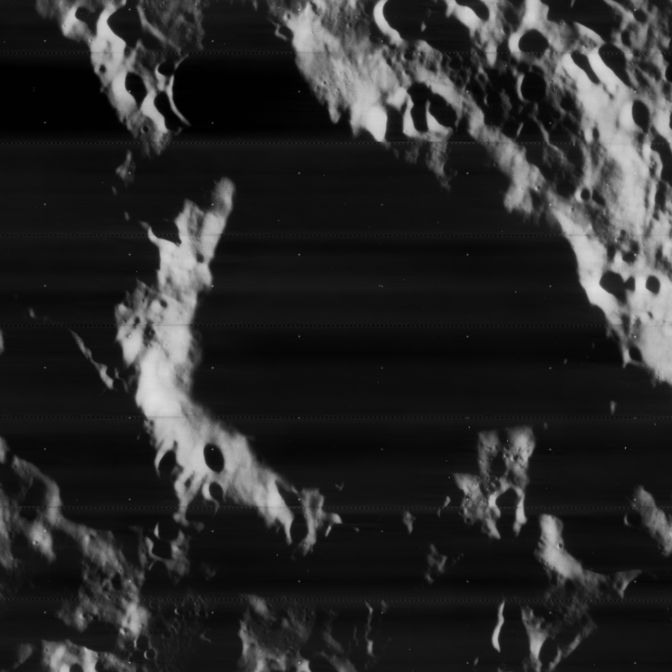
Lunar Orbiter 4 image

Boltzmann is an old lunar impact crater that is located along the southern limb of the Moon, in the vicinity of the south pole. At this location the crater is viewed from the side from Earth, and so not much detail can be seen. It is located to the north of the walled plain Drygalski, and to the west of the crater Le Gentil.

This formation has become eroded by many tiny impacts, leaving the features rounded and worn. Little of the original rim still stands above the surrounding terrain, leaving only a depression in the surface. The interior is relatively flat, with a rougher surface in the eastern half. There are several tiny craterlets on the crater interior, including a pair near the southwest inner wall and a small, bowl-shaped crater close to the eastern rim.

To the southeast of the crater rim is an arcing catena formation of tiny craterlets that joins the rim of Boltzmann to the northern rim of Drygalski.

This crater is named after Austrian physicist Ludwig Boltzmann (1844–1906). The name was introduced into lunar nomenclature by David W. G. Arthur and Ewen Whitaker with the Rectified Lunar Atlas (1963). Its designation was officially adopted by the International Astronomical Union in 1964.
