= Molecular chaos =

Assumption in the kinetic theory of gases

In the kinetic theory of gases in physics, the molecular chaos hypothesis (also called Stoßzahlansatz in the writings of Paul and Tatiana Ehrenfest) is the assumption that the velocities of colliding particles are uncorrelated, and independent of position. This means the probability that a pair of particles with given velocities will collide can be calculated by considering each particle separately and ignoring any correlation between the probability for finding one particle with velocity $v$ and probability for finding another velocity $v'$ in a small region $\delta r$. James Clerk Maxwell introduced this approximation in 1867 although its origins can be traced back to his first work on the kinetic theory in 1860.

The assumption of molecular chaos is the key ingredient that allows proceeding from the BBGKY hierarchy to Boltzmann's equation, by reducing the 2-particle distribution function showing up in the collision term to a product of 1-particle distributions. This in turn leads to Boltzmann's H-theorem of 1872, which attempted to use kinetic theory to show that the entropy of a gas prepared in a state of less than complete disorder must inevitably increase, as the gas molecules are allowed to collide. This drew the objection from Loschmidt that it should not be possible to deduce an irreversible process from time-symmetric dynamics and a time-symmetric formalism: something must be wrong (Loschmidt's paradox). The resolution (1895) of this paradox is that the velocities of two particles after a collision are no longer truly uncorrelated. By asserting that it was acceptable to ignore these correlations in the population at times after the initial time, Boltzmann had introduced an element of time asymmetry through the formalism of his calculation.

Though the Stosszahlansatz is usually understood as a physically grounded hypothesis, it was recently highlighted that it could also be interpreted as a heuristic hypothesis. This interpretation allows using the principle of maximum entropy in order to generalize the ansatz to higher-order distribution functions.

== See also ==
- Free molecular flow
- Ergodic hypothesis
