= Karl Přibram =

Karl Eman Přibram (22 December 1877, Prague – 15 July 1973, Washington, D.C.), also known as "Karl Pribram", was an Austrian-born economist. He is most noted for his work in labor economics, in industrial organization, and in the history of economic thought.

Přibram analyzed post-scholastic economic thought into three competing traditions:

- a nominalist tradition, which has typically provided foundations for liberal prescriptions
- an intuitionist tradition, which formed an intellectual infrastructure for fascistic prescriptions
- a tradition of Hegelian dialectics, which formed the intellectual infrastructure for Marxist Communism

His papers are held in the German and Jewish Intellectual Émigré Collection of the M.E. Grenander Department of Special Collections and Archives of the libraries of the University at Albany, the State University of New York.

== Positions ==
- chief of the Legislative Division for Social Policy in the Austrian Ministry for Social Administration, 1918–21
- head of the research and statistical department at the International Labour Office, Geneva, 1921–28
- professor of economics at the University of Frankfurt am Main, 1928–33
- research member of the Brookings Institution, 1933–35
- member of the U.S. Social Security Board, 1935–42
- senior economist at the U.S. Tariff Commission, 1942–51
- professor of economics at American University.

== Works ==
- Lohnschutz des gewerblichen Arbeiters nach österreichischem Recht (1904)
- Normalarbeitstag in den gewerblichen Betrieben und im Bergbaue Österreichs (1906)
- Entstehung der individualistischen Sozialphilosophie (1912)
- Probleme der internationalen Arbeitsstatistik (1925)
- Unification of Social Insurance (1925)
- "World-unemployment and Its Problems" in Unemployment as a world-problem (1931) by John Maynard Keynes, Karl Pribram, and E.J. Phelan; edited by Philip Quincy Wright
- "Equilibrium concept and business cycle statistics" (1934), Institut International de statistique, 22nd section, London.
- Cartel Problems; an Analysis of Collective Monopolies in Europe with American Application (1935)
- Social Insurance in Europe and Social Security in the United States: a Comparative Analysis (1937)
- Merit Rating and Unemployment Compensation (1937)
- Principles Underlying Disqualifications for Benefits in Unemployment Compensation (1938)
- Foreign Trade Policy of Austria (1945)
- Conflicting Patterns of Thought (1949)
- "Patterns of Economic Reasoning" in American Economic Review vol. 43 (2), Supplement (1953)
- A History of Economic Reasoning (1983, posthumous and incomplete) published by the Johns Hopkins University Press
