= Dysprosium stannate =

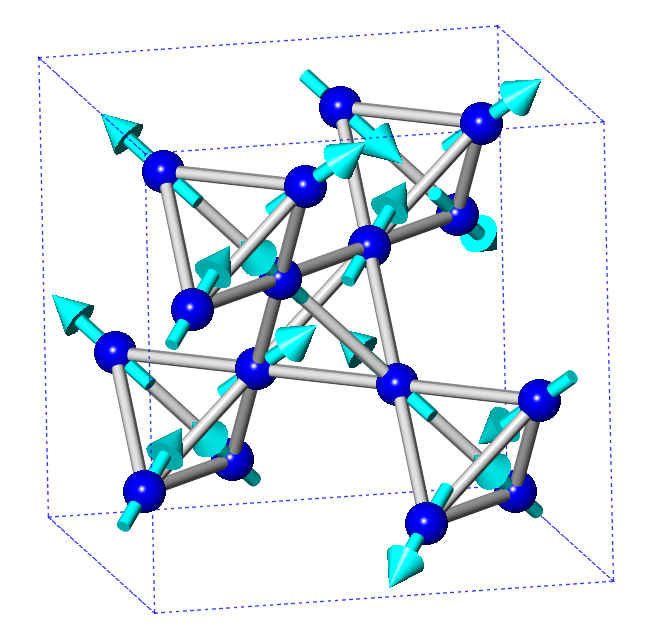

Names
- IUPAC name Dysprosium stannate
- Other names Dysprosium(III) stannate

Identifiers
CAS Number	12338-82-8
PubChem CID	165360186
CompTox Dashboard (EPA)	DTXSID601336777
- InChI: InChI=1S/2Dy.7O.2Sn/q2*+3;7*-2;2*+4 Key: NQAJIAKVXPCJHB-UHFFFAOYSA-N

Properties
Chemical formula	Dy2Sn2O7
Molar mass	747.64 g/mol
Appearance	White to pale yellow crystalline ceramic
Density	7.97 g/cm3
Solubility in water	Insoluble in water

Structure
Crystal structure	Pyrochlore
Space group	Fd3̅m (No. 227)
Lattice constant	a = 10.396 Å
- Except where otherwise noted, data are given for materials in their standard state (at 25 °C [77 °F], 100 kPa). Infobox references

Dysprosium stannate (Dy2Sn2O7) is an inorganic compound consisting of dysprosium, tin, and oxygen. It crystallizes in the cubic pyrochlore structure and is one of the best-known examples of a spin ice material. Along with dysprosium titanate (Dy2Ti2O7) and holmium titanate (Ho2Ti2O7), it has served as a model system for the study of geometrical frustration, emergent magnetic excitations, and low-temperature magnetism.

== History ==
Rare-earth pyrochlore stannates were synthesized and structurally characterized during the 1960s and 1970s as part of investigations into complex oxide ceramics. Their unusual magnetic behavior became apparent during the 1990s, when neutron scattering and thermodynamic measurements showed that the Ising-like Dy3+ moments remain magnetically disordered to very low temperatures despite strong magnetic interactions.

Following the proposal of the spin-ice model by Harris et al. in 1997 and the theoretical work of Bramwell and Gingras, Dy2Sn2O7 became recognized as one of a family of frustrated pyrochlore magnets that obey an analogue of the "ice rules" found in water ice.

== Properties ==
Dy2Sn2O7 adopts the cubic pyrochlore structure (space group Fd3̅m), in which both the Dy3+ and Sn4+ ions occupy interpenetrating networks of corner-sharing tetrahedra. The crystal structure gives rise to strong geometrical frustration of the magnetic moments.

The magnetic moments of Dy3+ ions are constrained by the crystal electric field to point along the local ⟨111⟩ directions, producing Ising-like anisotropy. At low temperatures the spins adopt the "two-in, two-out" configuration on each tetrahedron characteristic of the spin-ice state. Unlike conventional ferromagnets or antiferromagnets, the compound does not undergo long-range magnetic ordering under ambient conditions.

== Research ==
=== Spin ice ===
Dy2Sn2O7 is extensively studied as a canonical spin-ice material. Its low-temperature magnetic properties are analogous to the proton disorder in ordinary water ice, resulting in a residual configurational entropy first predicted by Linus Pauling for water ice.

=== Emergent magnetic monopoles ===
Excitations in the spin-ice state behave as effective magnetic monopoles connected by chains of reversed spins known as Dirac strings. Experimental evidence for these quasiparticles in pyrochlore spin-ice compounds was reported in 2009 using neutron scattering and magnetic measurements.

Although these experiments were performed primarily on Dy2Ti2O7 and Ho2Ti2O7, the same theoretical framework applies to Dy2Sn2O7, which exhibits similar spin-ice behavior.

=== Frustrated magnetism ===
Dy2Sn2O7 is widely used as a model system for investigating frustrated magnetic interactions, slow spin dynamics, magnetic relaxation, and non-equilibrium phenomena. The compound is also studied using neutron scattering, muon spin spectroscopy (μSR), AC susceptibility, and calorimetry to understand emergent collective behavior in geometrically frustrated materials.

== See also ==
- Spin ice
- Pyrochlore
- Geometrical frustration
- Dysprosium titanate
- Holmium titanate
