= Standard molar entropy =

Standard entropy content of one mole of a substance under a standard state

In chemistry, the standard molar entropy is the entropy content of one mole of pure substance at a standard state of pressure and any temperature of interest. These are often (but not necessarily) chosen to be the standard temperature and pressure.

The standard molar entropy at pressure = p^{⦵} is usually given the symbol S^{⦵}, and has units of joules per mole per kelvin (J mol^{−1} K^{−1}). Unlike standard enthalpies of formation, the value of S^{⦵} is absolute. That is, an element in its standard state has a definite, nonzero value of S^{⦵} at room temperature. The entropy of a pure crystalline structure can be 0 J mol^{−1} K^{−1} only at 0 K, according to the third law of thermodynamics. However, this assumes that the material forms a 'perfect crystal' without any residual entropy. This can be due to crystallographic defects, dislocations, and/or incomplete rotational quenching within the solid, as originally pointed out by Linus Pauling. These contributions to the entropy are always present, because crystals always grow at a finite rate and at temperature. However, the residual entropy is often quite negligible and can be accounted for when it occurs using statistical mechanics.

== Thermodynamics ==
If a mole of a solid substance is a perfectly ordered solid at 0 K, then if the solid is warmed by its surroundings to 298.15 K without melting, its absolute molar entropy would be the sum of a series of N stepwise and reversible entropy changes. The limit of this sum as $N \rightarrow \infty$ becomes an integral:

$$S^\circ = \sum_{k=1}^N \Delta S_k = \sum_{k=1}^N \frac{dQ_k}{T} \rightarrow \int _0 ^{T_2} \frac{dS}{dT} dT = \int _0 ^{T_2} \frac {C_{p_k}}{T} dT$$

In this example, $T_2 =298.15 K$ and $C_{p_k}$ is the molar heat capacity at a constant pressure of the substance in the reversible process k. The molar heat capacity is not constant during the experiment because it changes depending on the (increasing) temperature of the substance. Therefore, a table of values for $\frac{C_{p_k}}{T}$ is required to find the total molar entropy. The quantity $\frac{dQ_{k}}{T}$ represents the ratio of a very small exchange of heat energy to the temperature T. The total molar entropy is the sum of many small changes in molar entropy, where each small change can be considered a reversible process.

== Chemistry ==
The standard molar entropy of a gas at STP includes contributions from:

- The heat capacity of one mole of the solid from 0 K to the melting point (including heat absorbed in any changes between different crystal structures).
- The latent heat of fusion of the solid.
- The heat capacity of the liquid from the melting point to the boiling point.
- The latent heat of vaporization of the liquid.
- The heat capacity of the gas from the boiling point to room temperature.

Changes in entropy are associated with phase transitions and chemical reactions. Chemical equations make use of the standard molar entropy of reactants and products to find the standard entropy of reaction:

Δ_{r}S^{⦵} = S^{⦵}_{products} - S^{⦵}_{reactants}

The standard entropy of reaction helps determine whether the reaction will take place spontaneously. According to the second law of thermodynamics, a spontaneous reaction always results in an increase in total entropy of the system and its surroundings:

ΔS^{⦵}_{total} = ΔS^{⦵}_{system} + ΔS^{⦵}_{surroundings} > 0

Molar entropy is not the same for all gases. Under identical conditions, it is greater for a heavier gas.

== See also ==
- Entropy
- Heat
- Gibbs free energy
- Helmholtz free energy
- Standard state
- Third law of thermodynamics
