= Residual property =

Residual property may refer to:

- Residual property (mathematics), a property of groups
- Residual property (physics), a thermodynamic term
