= Residual property (physics) =

In thermodynamics a residual property is defined as the difference between a real fluid property and an ideal gas property, both considered at the same density, temperature, and composition, typically expressed as

$X(T, V, n) = X^{id}(T, V, n) + X^{res}(T, V, n)$

where $X$ is some thermodynamic property at given temperature, volume and mole numbers, $X^{id}$ is value of the property for an ideal gas, and $X^{res}$ is the residual property. The reference state is typically incorporated into the ideal gas contribution to the value, as

$X^{id}(T, V, n) = X^{\circ, id}(T, n) + \Delta_{id} X (T, V, n)$

where $X^{\circ, id}$ is the value of $X$ at the reference state (commonly pure, ideal gas species at 1 bar), and $\Delta_{id} X$ is the departure of the property for an ideal gas at $(T, V, n)$ from this reference state.

Residual properties should not be confused with excess properties, which are defined as the deviation of a thermodynamic property from some reference system, that is typically not an ideal gas system. Whereas excess properties and excess models (also known as activity coefficient models) typically concern themselves with strictly liquid-phase systems, such as smelts, polymer blends or electrolytes, residual properties are intimately linked to equations of state which are commonly used to model systems in which vapour-liquid equilibria are prevalent, or systems where both gases and liquids are of interest. For some applications, activity coefficient models and equations of state are combined in what are known as "$\gamma$-$\phi$ models" (read: Gamma-Phi) referring to the symbols commonly used to denote activity coefficients and fugacities.

== Significance ==
In the development and implementation of Equations of State, the concept of residual properties is valuable, as it allows one to separate the behaviour of a fluid that stems from non-ideality from that stemming from the properties of an ideal gas. For example, the isochoric heat capacity is given by

$C_V = \left(\frac{\partial U}{\partial T}\right) _{V,n} = T \left(\frac{\partial S}{\partial T}\right) _{V,n} = T \left[ \left(\frac{\partial S^{id}}{\partial T}\right) _{V,n} + \left(\frac{\partial S^{res}}{\partial T}\right) _{V,n} \right] = C_V^{id} + C_V^{res}$

Where the ideal gas heat capacity, $C_V^{id}$, can be measured experimentally, by measuring the heat capacity at very low pressure. After measurement it is typically represented using a polynomial fit such as the Shomate equation. The residual heat capacity is given by

$T \left(\frac{\partial S ^{res}}{\partial T}\right)_{V, n} = - T \left( \frac{\partial^2 A ^{res} }{\partial T^2} \right) _{V, n}$,

and the accuracy of a given equation of state in predicting or correlating the heat capacity can be assessed by regarding only the residual contribution, as the ideal contribution is independent of the equation of state.

=== In Equilibrium Calculations ===
In fluid phase equilibria (i.e. liquid-vapour or liquid-liquid equilibria), the notion of the fugacity coefficient is crucial, as it can be shown that the equilibrium condition for a system consisting of phases $\alpha$, $\beta$, $\gamma$, ... the condition for chemical equilibrium is

$x_i^\alpha \Phi_i^\alpha = x_i^\beta \Phi_i^\beta = x_i^\gamma \Phi_i^\gamma = \quad ...$

for all species $i$, where $x_i^j$ denotes the mole fraction of species $i$ in phase $j$, and $\Phi_i^j$ is the fugacity coefficient of species $i$ in phase $j$. The fugacity coefficient, being defined by

$\mu_i = \mu_i^\circ + RT \ln \frac{\Phi_i x_i p}{p^\circ}$

is directly related to the residual chemical potential, as

$\mu_i = \mu_i ^{id} + \mu_i ^{res} = \mu_i ^\circ + RT \ln \frac{x_i p}{p ^\circ} + \mu_i^{res} \implies \mu_i^{res} = RT \ln \Phi_i$,

thus, because $\mu_i^{res} = \left(\frac{\partial A ^{res}}{\partial n_i}\right)_{T, V}$, we can see that an accurate description of the residual Helmholtz energy, rather than the total Helmholtz energy, is the key to accurately computing the equilibrium state of a system.

=== Residual Entropy Scaling ===
The residual entropy of a fluid has some special significance. In 1976, Yasha Rosenfeld published a landmark paper, showing that the transport coefficients of pure liquids, when expressed as functions of the residual entropy, can be treated as monovariate functions, rather than as functions of two variables (i.e. temperature and pressure, or temperature and density). This discovery lead to the concept of residual entropy scaling, which has spurred a large amount of research, up until the modern day, in which various approaches for modelling transport coefficients as functions of the residual entropy have been explored. Residual entropy scaling is still very much an area of active research.

== Dependence on variable set ==
While any real state variable $X$, in a real state ($T, V, p, n$), is independent of whether one evaluates $X(T, p, n)$ or $X(T, V, n)$, one should be aware that the residual property is in general dependent on the variable set, i.e.

$X^{res}(T, p, n) \neq X^{res}(T, V, n)$

This arises from the fact that the real state $(T, V, p, n)$ is in general not a valid ideal gas state, such that the ideal part of the property will be different depending on variable set. Take for example the chemical potential of a pure fluid: In a state $(T, V, p, n)$ that does not satisfy the ideal gas law, but may be a real state for some real fluid. The ideal gas chemical potential computed as a function of temperature, pressure and mole number is

$\mu^{id} (T, p, n) = \mu^\circ + RT \ln \frac{p}{p^\circ}$,

while computing it as a function of concentration ($c = n / V$), we have

$\mu^{id}(T, V, n) = \mu^\circ + RT \ln \frac{c}{c^\circ}$,

such that

$\mu^{id}(T, p, n) - \mu^{id}(T, V, n) = RT \ln \frac{p}{p^\circ} - RT \ln \frac{c}{c^\circ} = RT \ln \frac{pV}{nRT} = RT \ln Z$,

where we have used $p^\circ = c^\circ RT$, and $Z$ denotes the compressibility factor. This leads to the result

$\mu_i (T, p, n) - \mu_i (T, V, n) = 0 \implies \mu_i^{res} (T, V, n) - \mu_i^{res} (T, p, n) = RT \ln Z$.

== Practical Calculation ==
In practice, the most significant residual property is the residual Helmholtz energy. The reason for this is that other residual properties can be computed from the residual Helmholtz energy as various derivatives (see: Maxwell relations). We note that

$\left(\frac{\partial A}{\partial V}\right)_{T, n} = \left(\frac{\partial A^{id}}{\partial V}\right)_{T, n} + \left(\frac{\partial A^{res}}{\partial V}\right)_{T, n} \iff \left(\frac{\partial A^{res}}{\partial V}\right)_{T, n} = \left(\frac{\partial A}{\partial V}\right)_{T, n} - \left(\frac{\partial A^{id}}{\partial V}\right)_{T, n} = - p(T, V, n) - (- p^{id} (T, V, n) )$

such that
$$A^{res}(T, V' , n) - A^{res}(T, V = \infty, n)
= \int_\infty ^{V' } \left( \frac{\partial A^{res}}{\partial V} \right) dV
= \int_\infty ^{V'} p^{id}(T, V, n) - p(T, V, n) d V$$
further, because any fluid reduces to an ideal gas in the limit of infinite volume,

$A(T, V = \infty, n) = A^{id}(T, V = \infty, n) \iff A^{res}(T, V = \infty, n) = 0$.

Thus, for any Equation of State that is explicit in pressure, such as the van der Waals Equation of State, we may compute

$A^{res}(T, V, n) = \int_\infty ^V \frac{n R T}{V '} - p(T, V ', n) d V'$.

However, in modern approaches to developing Equations of State, such as SAFT, it is found that it can be simpler to develop the equation of state by directly developing an equation for $A^{res}$, rather than developing an equation that is explicit in pressure.

== Correlated terms ==
- Departure function
