= Control rod =

Device used to regulate the power of a nuclear reactor

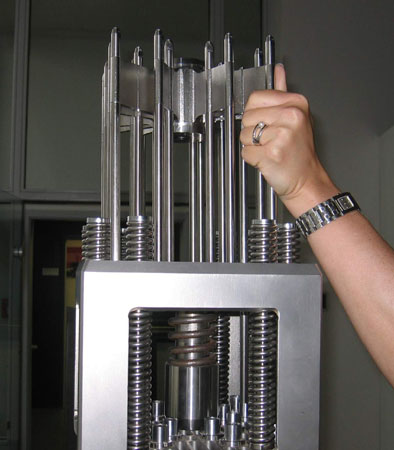
Control rod assembly for a pressurized water reactor, above fuel element. Note control rod spider at top, with vanes.

Control rods are used in nuclear reactors to control the rate of fission of the nuclear fuel – uranium or plutonium. Their compositions include chemical elements such as boron, cadmium, silver, hafnium, or indium, that are capable of absorbing many neutrons without themselves decaying. These elements have different neutron capture cross sections for neutrons of various energies. Boiling water reactors (BWR), pressurized water reactors (PWR), and heavy-water reactors (HWR) operate with thermal neutrons, while fast reactors operate with fast neutrons. Each reactor design can use different control rod material based on the energy spectrum of its neutrons. Control rods have been used in nuclear aircraft engines like Project Pluto as a method of control.

== Operating principle ==
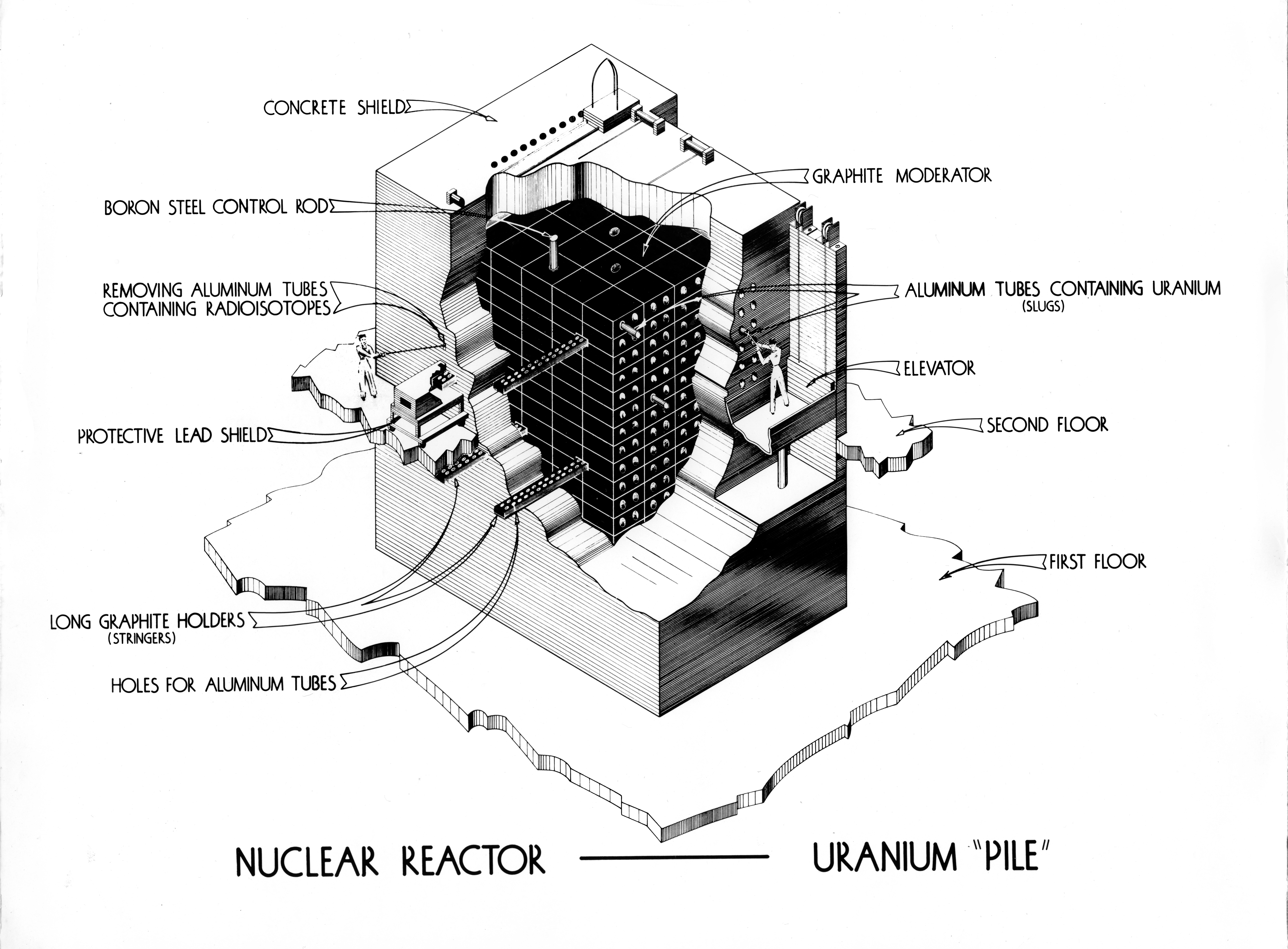
1943 Reactor diagram using boron control rods

Control rods are inserted into the core of a nuclear reactor and adjusted in order to control the rate of the nuclear chain reaction and, thereby, the thermal power output of the reactor, the rate of steam production, and the electrical power output of the power station.

Animated schematic showing control rods being inserted into a reactor core, absorbing neutrons and reducing reactivity. White dots represent neutrons, orange blocks the fuel, and gray blocks the control rods.

The number of control rods inserted, and the distance to which they are inserted, strongly influence the reactivity of the reactor. When reactivity (as effective neutron multiplication factor) is above 1, the rate of the nuclear chain reaction increases exponentially over time. When reactivity is below 1, the rate of the reaction decreases exponentially over time. When all control rods are fully inserted, they keep reactivity barely above 0, which quickly slows a running reactor to a stop and keeps it stopped (in shutdown). If the inserted control rods are withdrawn from a critical operating core, the core becomes supercritical and power rises exponentially. In designs with an overall negative temperature coefficient, hotter fuel adds negative reactivity, countering the increase, so power levels off at a higher value; that value can still damage the fuel if the protection system does not shut the reactor down. Where the combined feedback is instead positive, the rise feeds on itself: coolant voiding adds reactivity and the excursion can accelerate until the core is destroyed, as in the 1986 Chernobyl accident. Maintaining a constant power output requires keeping the long-term average neutron multiplication factor close to 1.

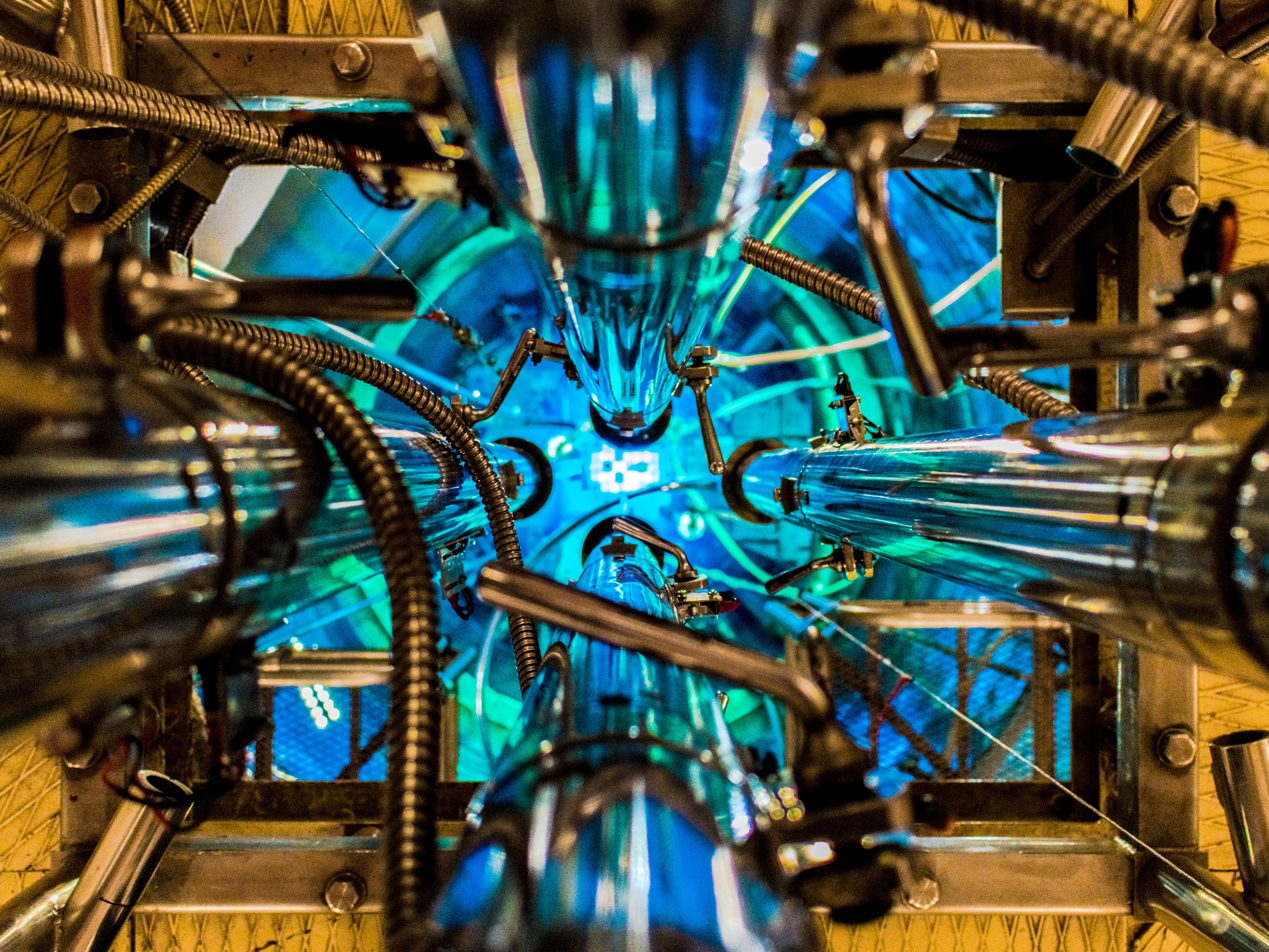
Overhead photograph of the RA-3 research reactor pool with visible control rod systems (CNEA, Argentina)

A new reactor is assembled with its control rods fully inserted. Control rods are partially removed from the core to allow the nuclear chain reaction to start up and increase to the desired power level. Neutron flux can be measured, and is roughly proportional to reaction rate and power level. To increase power output, some control rods are pulled out a small distance for a while. To decrease power output, some control rods are pushed in a small distance for a while. Several other factors affect the reactivity; to compensate for them, an automatic control system adjusts the control rods small amounts in or out, as-needed in some reactors. Each control rod influences some part of the reactor more than others; calculated adjustments to fuel distribution can be made to maintain similar reaction rates and temperatures in different parts of the core.

Typical shutdown time for modern reactors such as the European Pressurized Reactor or Advanced CANDU reactor is two seconds for 90% reduction, limited by decay heat. Control rods are usually used in control rod assemblies (typically 20 rods for a commercial PWR assembly) and inserted into guide tubes within the fuel elements. Control rods often stand vertically within the core. In PWRs they are inserted from above, with the control rod drive mechanisms mounted on the reactor pressure vessel head. In BWRs, due to the necessity of a steam dryer above the core, this design requires insertion of the control rods from beneath.

== Reactivity worth ==
A control poison is any neutron absorber that is put into a core on purpose. It can be a control rod, a soluble absorber carried by the coolant, or a burnable absorber built into the fuel or another core component. Rods are moved in and out to set the multiplication factor for startup, shutdown and power changes, and they compensate as well for the reactivity changes that come with fuel burnup, accumulation of fission products, temperature changes and other effects, which is what keeps a reactor critical at a constant power. A poison changes the multiplication factor and the shape of the flux at the same time.

For a reactor that is critical before a poison is added, the negative reactivity introduced is $\rho = (k'-1)/k'$, where $k'$ is the multiplication factor with the poison in place, and this decrease is called the worth of the absorber. Assuming one-group diffusion theory, a uniform, unreflected core, fluxes that vanish at the extrapolated boundary, and a poison that changes only the absorption cross section, from $\Sigma_a$ to $\Sigma_a + \delta\Sigma_a$, multiplying the diffusion equation for the poisoned core by the unpoisoned flux, and the unpoisoned equation by the poisoned flux, then integrating and subtracting, gives the worth with no further approximation:
$$\rho = -\frac{\int \phi\,\delta\Sigma_a\,\phi'\,dV}{\int \phi\,\nu\Sigma_f\,\phi'\,dV},$$
where $\phi$ and $\phi'$ are the fluxes before and after insertion. If the added absorption is spread uniformly over the core, as for soluble boron in the coolant, the same factor $\int \phi\,\phi'\,dV$ appears in the numerator and the denominator, so the change in flux shape cancels and the worth reduces to $\rho = -\delta\Sigma_a/\nu\Sigma_f = -(1/k_\infty)(\delta\Sigma_a/\Sigma_a).$

A localized poison such as a rod requires the changed flux distribution itself. Where the change is small, writing $\phi' = \phi + \delta\phi$ and neglecting $\delta\phi$ gives the first-order perturbation approximation,
$$\rho = -\frac{\int \delta\Sigma_a\,\phi^2\,dV}{\int \nu\Sigma_f\,\phi^2\,dV},$$
so the worth of a localized absorber is the added absorption weighted by the square of the unperturbed flux, and it is greatest where that flux is highest.

Schematic of a cylindrical reactor core with a control rod inserted from above.

The reactivity worth of a control rod is not proportional to the distance it is inserted. The reason is the weighting by the square of the flux: a partially inserted rod gains worth fastest while its tip is near the core midplane, where the flux is highest, and slowly while the tip is near the top or bottom of the core. A first-order perturbation treatment gives this quantitatively for a uniform cylindrical core with a cosine axial flux over an extrapolated height $\tilde H$, provided the rod introduces too little reactivity to distort the flux distribution appreciably. Under that approximation, the negative reactivity contributed by a rod at radius $r$ inserted a distance $x$ follows an S-shaped curve with insertion depth:
$$\rho_{r,x} = \left[\frac{x}{\tilde H} - \frac{1}{2\pi}\sin\left(\frac{2\pi x}{\tilde H}\right)\right]\rho_{r,H},$$
where $\rho_{r,H}$ is the negative reactivity of the same rod when it spans the full core height. The worth at a given insertion depth is called the integral worth of the rod, and its slope, the change in worth per unit of insertion, is called the differential worth. Within the same approximation, the radial position enters separately from the insertion depth. For a uniform cylindrical core the unperturbed flux varies radially as $J_0(2.405r/\tilde R)$, where $\tilde R$ is the extrapolated radius, $J_0$ is the zeroth-order Bessel function and 2.405 is its first zero, so the worth of a rod at radius $r$ is
$$\rho_{r,x} = J_0^2\left(\frac{2.405\,r}{\tilde R}\right)\rho_{0,x},$$
where $\rho_{0,x}$ is the worth at the same insertion depth for a rod on the core centerline. An otherwise identical rod away from the centerline therefore has a smaller worth magnitude, with the same radial reduction factor at every insertion depth.

=== Banks of control rods ===
Control rods normally move in banks, inserted or withdrawn in unison. A bank changes the flux distribution by enough that the first-order approximation fails, so the flux is calculated separately in the rodded and unrodded parts of the core. In a uniform cylindrical core of height equal to its diameter the infinite multiplication factor is treated as a function of height, reduced by the factor $1-\rho_b$ in the region occupied by the bank, where $\rho_b = \delta k_\infty/k_\infty$ is the fractional reduction in the infinite multiplication factor produced by the bank when it spans the full core height, while the migration length $M$ is assumed unchanged. Separating variables then leaves an ordinary differential equation in each region, with the flux vanishing at the extrapolated base and top, and matching the flux and its slope at the tip of the bank, taking the diffusion coefficient to be the same in both regions, then yields a transcendental equation that is solved numerically for the multiplication factor. Its limits reduce to the expected forms: with the bank fully withdrawn $k_u = k_\infty/[1 + M^2(B_r^2 + B_z^2)]$, and with it fully inserted $k_r = (1 - \rho_b)k_u.$ Rod worths are not additive, because each rod changes the flux seen by its neighbours: with the reactor held at constant power a rod depresses the flux in its vicinity and raises it farther out, so the combined worth of neighbouring rods is less than the sum of their separate worths when the rods are close together, and can be greater than the sum when they are far enough apart. This is called shadowing, positive in the first case and negative in the second. A rod is worth more near the core axis of an unperturbed core, where the flux is highest, and the rods of a large power reactor are inserted and withdrawn in a prescribed pattern that limits distortion of the power distribution and favours uniform fuel burnup. Interference between the rods is carried as a correction factor in the shutdown margin calculation, as in the High Temperature Engineering Test Reactor (HTTR).

=== Coupling and flux distortion ===
How steeply the worth of a bank builds up with insertion depends on how tightly the core is coupled, which is measured by the ratio $\tilde H/M$ of core height to migration length. In a tightly coupled core, with a small ratio, a disturbance crosses the core in relatively few migration lengths and neutron generations, so the flux stays close to the unperturbed cosine and the worth curve stays close to the single-rod result above. In a loosely coupled core many generations are needed to carry a disturbance, so in a core with $\tilde H/M$ near 50 the bank hardly affects the multiplication until it is more than halfway inserted, the flux is driven toward the bottom of the core, and the peaking in the normalized flux can become severe. Because power density limits make higher-power cores larger, within a single class of reactors a higher power therefore means a bigger core and a more loosely coupled one; the cores of thermal reactors are less tightly coupled still than those of fast reactors, and may have values of $\tilde H/M$ substantially above 50, so limiting power peaking from rod movement and refueling patterns is an increasing design concern.

=== Measuring rod worth ===
Rod worth is measured by rapidly inserting the rod or bank into a core that is critical at steady power and integrating the power history over time, which gives the integral worth of the absorber; because it rests on a time integral, this rod-drop method is less sensitive than the inhour method to the waiting time chosen for each step of a series of measurements. When a bank of N rods of equal worth is dropped into a core that is critical, the prompt drop in power level gives the inserted reactivity through the prompt-drop approximation, and dividing it by N gives the worth of a single rod. Where a rod is withdrawn in steps, the inverse kinetics method reconstructs the reactivity change from the measured flux history, as in the calibration of the worth curves of the HTTR control rods.

== Materials ==
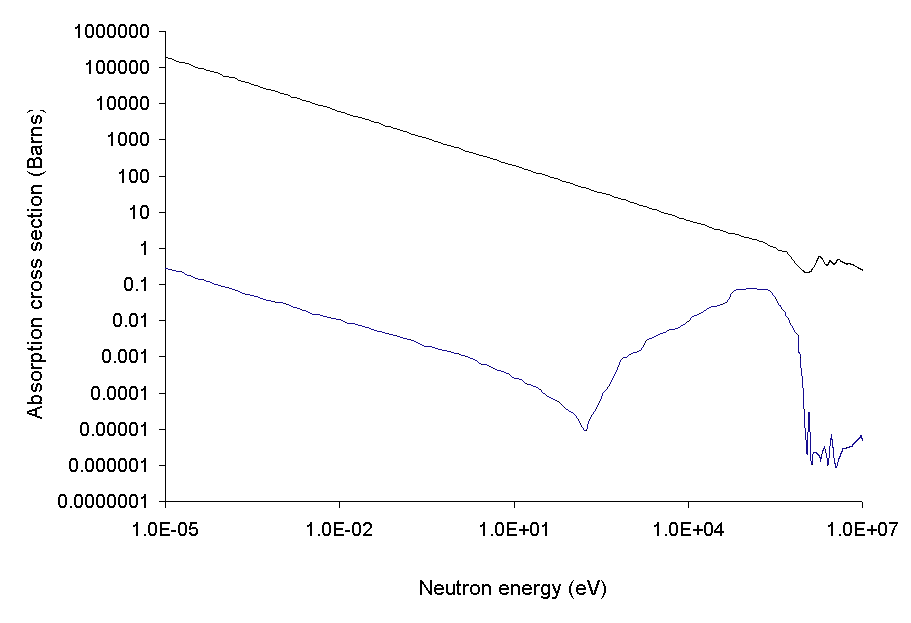
The absorption cross section for ^{10}B (top) and ^{11}B (bottom) as a function of energy

Chemical elements with usefully high neutron capture cross-sections include silver, indium, and cadmium. Other candidate elements include boron, cobalt, hafnium, samarium, europium, gadolinium, terbium, dysprosium, holmium, erbium, thulium, ytterbium, and lutetium. Alloys or compounds may also be used, such as high-boron steel, (Note: limited to use only in research reactors due to increased swelling from helium and lithium due to neutron absorption of boron in the (n, alpha) reaction) silver-indium-cadmium alloy, boron carbide, zirconium diboride, titanium diboride, hafnium diboride, gadolinium nitrate, (Note: injected into D_{2}O moderator of Advanced CANDU reactor) gadolinium titanate, dysprosium titanate, and boron carbide–europium hexaboride composite.

The material choice is influenced by the neutron energy in the reactor, their resistance to neutron-induced swelling, and the required mechanical and lifespan properties. The rods may have the form of tubes filled with neutron-absorbing pellets or powder. The tubes can be made of stainless steel or other "neutron window" materials such as zirconium, chromium, silicon carbide, or cubic ^{11}B^{15}N (cubic boron nitride).

The burnup of "burnable poison" isotopes also limits lifespan of a control rod. They may be reduced by using an element such as hafnium, a "non-burnable poison" which captures multiple neutrons before losing effectiveness, or by not using neutron absorbers for trimming. For example, in pebble bed reactors or in possible new type lithium-7-moderated and -cooled reactors that use fuel and absorber pebbles.

Some rare-earth elements are excellent neutron absorbers and are more common than silver (reserves of about 500,000t). For example, ytterbium (reserves about one M tons) and yttrium, 400 times more common, with middle capturing values, can be found and used together without separation inside minerals like xenotime (Yb) (Yb_{0.40}Y_{0.27}Lu_{0.12}Er_{0.12}Dy_{0.05}Tm_{0.04}Ho_{0.01})PO_{4}, or keiviite (Yb) (Yb_{1.43}Lu_{0.23}Er_{0.17}Tm_{0.08}Y_{0.05}Dy_{0.03}Ho_{0.02})_{2}Si_{2}O_{7}, lowering the cost. Xenon is also a strong neutron absorber as a gas, and can be used for controlling and (emergency) stopping helium-cooled reactors, but does not function in cases of pressure loss, or as a burning protection gas together with argon around the vessel part especially in case of core catching reactors or if filled with sodium or lithium. Fission-produced xenon can be used after waiting for caesium to precipitate, when practically no radioactivity is left. Cobalt-59 is also used as an absorber for winning of cobalt-60 for use as a gamma ray source. Control rods can also be constructed as thick turnable rods with a tungsten reflector and absorber side turned to stop by a spring in less than one second.

Silver-indium-cadmium alloys, generally 80% Ag, 15% In, and 5% Cd, are a common control rod material for pressurized water reactors. The somewhat different energy absorption regions of the materials make the alloy an excellent neutron absorber. It has good mechanical strength and can be easily fabricated. It must be encased in stainless steel to prevent corrosion in hot water. Although indium is less rare than silver, it is more expensive.

Boron is another common neutron absorber. Due to the different cross sections of ^{10}B and ^{11}B, materials containing boron enriched in ^{10}B by isotopic separation are frequently used. The wide absorption spectrum of boron also makes it suitable as a neutron shield. The mechanical properties of boron in its elementary form are unsuitable, and therefore alloys or compounds have to be used instead. Common choices are high-boron steel and boron carbide. The latter is used as a control rod material in both PWRs and BWRs. ^{10}B/^{11}B separation is done commercially with gas centrifuges over BF_{3}, but can also be done over BH_{3} from borane production or directly with an energy optimized melting centrifuge, using the heat of freshly separated boron for preheating.

Hafnium has excellent properties for reactors using water for both moderation and cooling. It has good mechanical strength, can be easily fabricated, and is resistant to corrosion in hot water. Hafnium can be alloyed with other elements, e.g. with tin and oxygen to increase tensile and creep strength, with iron, chromium, and niobium for corrosion resistance, and with molybdenum for wear resistance, hardness, and machineability. Such alloys are designated as Hafaloy, Hafaloy-M, Hafaloy-N, and Hafaloy-NM. The high cost and low availability of hafnium limit its use in civilian reactors, although it is used in some US Navy reactors. Hafnium carbide can also be used as an insoluble material with a high melting point of 3890 °C and density higher than that of uranium dioxide for sinking, unmelted, through corium.

Dysprosium titanate was undergoing evaluation for pressurized water control rods. Dysprosium titanate is a promising replacement for Ag-In-Cd alloys because it has a much higher melting point, does not tend to react with cladding materials, is easy to produce, does not produce radioactive waste, does not swell and does not outgas. It was developed in Russia and is recommended by some for VVER and RBMK reactors. A disadvantage is less titanium and oxide absorption, that other neutron absorbing elements do not react with the already high-melting point cladding materials and that just using the unseparated content with dysprosium inside of minerals like Keiviit Yb inside chromium, SiC or c11B15N tubes deliver superior price and absorption without swelling and outgassing.

Hafnium diboride is another such material. It can be used alone or in a sintered mixture of hafnium and boron carbide powders.

Many other compounds of rare-earth elements can be used, such as samarium with boron-like europium and samarium boride, which is already used in the colour industry. Less absorptive compounds of boron similar to titanium, but inexpensive, such as molybdenum as Mo_{2}B_{5}. Since they all swell with boron, in practice other compounds are better, such as carbides, or compounds with two or more neutron-absorbing elements together. It is important that tungsten, and probably also other elements such as tantalum, have much the same high capture qualities as hafnium, but with the opposite effect. This is not explainable by neutron reflection alone. An obvious explanation is resonance gamma rays increasing the fission and breeding ratio versus causing greater capture of uranium, and others over metastable conditions such as for isotope ^{235m}U, which has a half-life of approximately 26 minutes.

=== Additional means of reactivity regulation ===
Other means of controlling reactivity include (for PWR) a soluble neutron absorber (boric acid) added to the reactor coolant, allowing most of the control rods to be withdrawn during stationary power operation, ensuring an even power and flux distribution over the entire core. This chemical shim, along with the use of burnable neutron poisons within the fuel pellets, is used to assist regulation of the core's long term reactivity, while the control rods are used for rapid reactor power changes (e.g. shutdown and start up). Operators of BWRs use the coolant flow through the core to control reactivity by varying the speed of the reactor recirculation pumps (an increase in coolant flow through the core improves the removal of steam bubbles, thus increasing the density of the coolant/moderator, increasing power).

== Safety ==
In most reactor designs, as a safety measure, control rods are attached to the lifting machinery by electromagnets, rather than direct mechanical linkage. This means that in the event of power failure, or if manually invoked due to failure of the lifting machinery, the control rods fall automatically, under gravity, all the way into the pile to stop the reaction. A notable exception to this fail-safe mode of operation is the BWR, which requires hydraulic insertion in the event of an emergency shut-down, using water from a special tank under high pressure. Quickly shutting down a reactor in this way is called scramming.

=== Criticality accident prevention ===
Mismanagement or control rod failure have often been blamed for nuclear accidents, including the SL-1 explosion and the Chernobyl disaster. Homogeneous neutron absorbers have often been used to manage criticality accidents which involve aqueous solutions of fissile metals. In several such accidents, either borax (sodium borate) or a cadmium compound has been added to the system. The cadmium can be added as a metal to nitric acid solutions of fissile material; the corrosion of the cadmium in the acid will then generate cadmium nitrate in situ.

In carbon dioxide-cooled reactors such as the AGR, if the solid control rods fail to arrest the nuclear reaction, nitrogen gas can be injected into the primary coolant cycle. This is because nitrogen has a larger absorption cross-section for neutrons than carbon or oxygen; hence, the core then becomes less reactive.

As the neutron energy increases, the neutron cross section of most isotopes decreases. The boron isotope ^{10}B is responsible for the majority of the neutron absorption. Boron-containing materials can also be used as neutron shielding, to reduce the activation of material close to a reactor core.

== See also ==
- Nuclear power
- Nuclear reactor
- Nuclear safety
- Wigner effect
