= Spin ice =

Magnetic material under special conditions

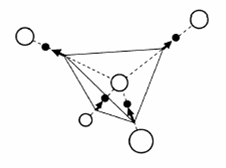
Figure 1. The arrangement of hydrogen atoms (black circles) about oxygen atoms (open circles) in ice. Two hydrogen atoms (bottom ones) are close to the central oxygen atom while two of them (top ones) are far and closer to the two other (top left and top right) oxygen atoms.

A spin ice is a magnetic substance that does not have a single minimal-energy state. It has magnetic moments (i.e. "spin") as elementary degrees of freedom which are subject to frustrated interactions. By their nature, these interactions prevent the moments from exhibiting a periodic pattern in their orientation down to a temperature much below the energy scale set by the said interactions. Spin ices show low-temperature properties, residual entropy in particular, closely related to those of common crystalline water ice. The most prominent compounds with such properties are dysprosium titanate (Dy_{2}Ti_{2}O_{7}) and holmium titanate (Ho_{2}Ti_{2}O_{7}). The orientation of the magnetic moments in spin ice resembles the positional organization of hydrogen atoms (more accurately, ionized hydrogen, or protons) in conventional water ice (see figure 1).

Experiments have found evidence for the existence of deconfined magnetic monopoles in these materials, with properties resembling those of the hypothetical magnetic monopoles postulated to exist in vacuum.

== Technical description ==
In 1935, Linus Pauling noted that the hydrogen atoms in water ice would be expected to remain disordered even at absolute zero. That is, even upon cooling to zero temperature, water ice is expected to have residual entropy, i.e., intrinsic randomness. This is due to the fact that the hexagonal crystalline structure of common water ice contains oxygen atoms with four neighboring hydrogen atoms. In ice, for each oxygen atom, two of the neighboring hydrogen atoms are near (forming the traditional H_{2}O molecule), and two are further away (being the hydrogen atoms of two neighboring water molecules). Pauling noted that the number of configurations conforming to this "two-near, two-far" ice rule grows exponentially with the system size, and, therefore, that the zero-temperature entropy of ice was expected to be extensive. Pauling's findings were confirmed by specific heat measurements, though pure crystals of water ice are particularly hard to create.

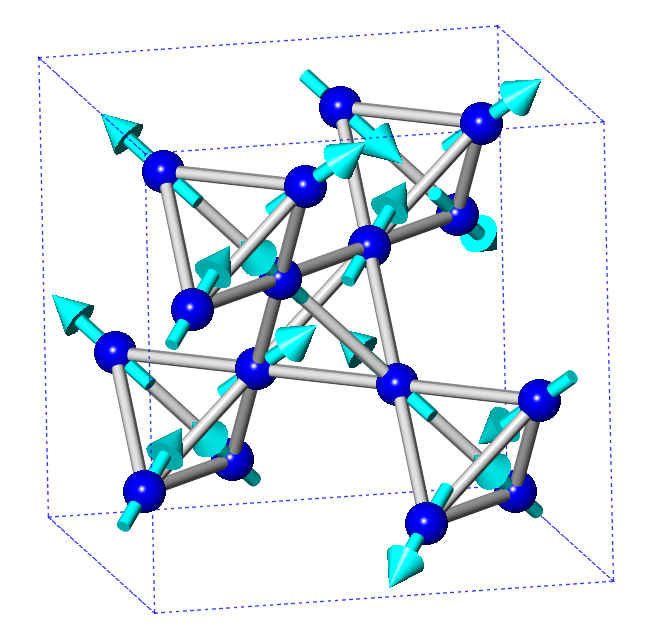
Figure 2. Portion of a pyrochlore lattice of corner-linked tetrahedra. The magnetic ions (dark blue spheres) sit on a network of tetrahedra linked at their vertices. The other atoms (e.g. Ti and O) making the pyrochlore crystal structure are not displayed. The magnetic moments (light blue arrows) obey the two-in, two out spin ice rule over the whole lattice. The system is thus in a spin ice state.

Spin ices are materials that consist of regular corner-linked tetrahedra of magnetic ions, each of which has a non-zero magnetic moment, often abridged to "spin", which must satisfy in their low-energy state a "two-in, two-out" rule on each tetrahedron making the crystalline structure (see figure 2). This is highly analogous to the two-near, two far rule in water ice (see figure 1). Just as Pauling showed that the ice rule leads to an extensive entropy in water ice, so does the two-in, two-out rule in the spin ice systems – these exhibit the same residual entropy properties as water ice. Be that as it may, depending on the specific spin ice material, it is generally much easier to create large single crystals of spin ice materials than water ice crystals. Additionally, the ease to induce interaction of the magnetic moments with an external magnetic field in a spin ice system makes the spin ices more suitable than water ice for exploring how the residual entropy can be affected by external influences.

While Philip Anderson had already noted in 1956 the connection between the problem of the frustrated Ising antiferromagnet on a (pyrochlore) lattice of corner-shared tetrahedra and Pauling's water ice problem, real spin ice materials were only discovered forty years later. The first materials identified as spin ices were the pyrochlores Dy_{2}Ti_{2}O_{7} (dysprosium titanate), Ho_{2}Ti_{2}O_{7} (holmium titanate). In addition, compelling evidence has been reported that Dy_{2}Sn_{2}O_{7} (dysprosium stannate) and Ho_{2}Sn_{2}O_{7} (holmium stannate) are spin ices. These four compounds belong to the family of rare-earth pyrochlore oxides. CdEr_{2}Se_{4}, a spinel in which the magnetic Er^{3+} ions sit on corner-linked tetrahedra, also displays spin ice behavior.

Spin ice materials are characterized by a random disorder in the orientation of the moment of the magnetic ions, even when the material is at very low temperatures. Alternating current (AC) magnetic susceptibility measurements find evidence for a dynamic freezing of the magnetic moments as the temperature is lowered somewhat below the temperature at which the specific heat displays a maximum. The broad maximum in the heat capacity does not correspond to a phase transition. Rather, the temperature at which the maximum occurs, about 1 K in Dy_{2}Ti_{2}O_{7}, signals a rapid change in the number of tetrahedra where the two-in, two-out rule is violated. Tetrahedra where the rule is violated are sites where the aforementioned monopoles reside. Mathematically, spin ice configurations can be described by closed Eulerian paths.

== Magnetic monopoles ==
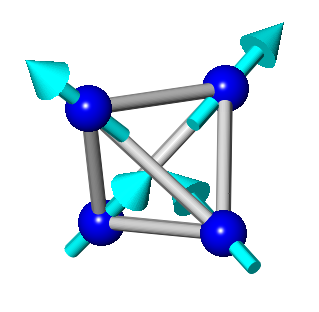
Figure 3. The orientation of the magnetic moments (light blue arrows) considering a single tetrahedron within the spin ice state, as in figure 2. Here, the magnetic moments obey the two-in, two-out rule: there is as much "magnetization field" going in the tetrahedron (bottom two arrows) as there is going out (top two arrows). The corresponding magnetization field has zero divergence. There is therefore no sink or source of the magnetization inside the tetrahedron, or no monopole. If a thermal fluctuation caused one of the bottom two magnetic moments to flip from "in" to "out", one would then have a 1-in, 3-out configuration; hence an "outflow' of magnetization, hence a positive divergence, that one could assign to a positively charged monopole of charge +Q. Flipping the two bottom magnetic moments would give a 0-in, 4-out configuration, the maximum possible "outflow" (i.e. divergence) of magnetization and, therefore, an associated monopole of charge +2Q.

Spin ices are geometrically frustrated magnetic systems. While frustration is usually associated with triangular or tetrahedral arrangements of magnetic moments coupled via antiferromagnetic exchange interactions, as in Anderson's Ising model, spin ices are frustrated ferromagnets. It is the very strong local magnetic anisotropy from the crystal field forcing the magnetic moments to point either in or out of a tetrahedron that renders ferromagnetic interactions frustrated in spin ices. Most importantly, it is the long-range magnetostatic dipole–dipole interaction, and not the nearest-neighbor exchange, that causes the frustration and the consequential two-in, two-out rule that leads to the spin ice phenomenology.

For a tetrahedron in a two-in, two-out state, the magnetization field is divergent-free; there is as much "magnetization intensity" entering a tetrahedron as there is leaving (see figure 3). In such a divergent-free situation, there exists no source or sink for the field. According to Gauss' theorem (also known as Ostrogradsky's theorem), a nonzero divergence of a field is caused, and can be characterized, by a real number called "charge". In the context of spin ice, such charges characterizing the violation of the two-in, two-out magnetic moment orientation rule are the aforementioned monopoles.

In Autumn 2009, researchers reported experimental observation of low-energy quasiparticles resembling the predicted monopoles in spin ice. A single crystal of the dysprosium titanate spin ice candidate was examined in the temperature range of 0.6–2.0 K. Using neutron scattering, the magnetic moments were shown to align in the spin ice material into interwoven tube-like bundles resembling Dirac strings. At the defect formed by the end of each tube, the magnetic field looks like that of a monopole. Using an applied magnetic field, the researchers were able to control the density and orientation of these strings. A description of the heat capacity of the material in terms of an effective gas of these quasiparticles was also presented.

The effective charge of a magnetic monopole, Q (see figure 3) in both the dysprosium and holmium titanate spin ice compounds is approximately Q = 5 μ_{B}Å^{−1} (Bohr magnetons per angstrom). The elementary magnetic constituents of spin ice are magnetic dipoles, so the emergence of monopoles is an example of the phenomenon of fractionalization.

The microscopic origin of the atomic magnetic moments in magnetic materials is quantum mechanical; the Planck constant enters explicitly in the equation defining the magnetic moment of an electron, along with its charge and its mass. Yet, the magnetic moments in the dysprosium titanate and the holmium titanate spin ice materials are effectively described by classical statistical mechanics, and not quantum statistical mechanics, over the experimentally relevant and reasonably accessible temperature range (between 0.05 K and 2 K) where the spin ice phenomena manifest themselves. Although the weakness of quantum effects in these two compounds is rather unusual, it is believed to be understood. There is current interest in the search of quantum spin ices, materials in which the laws of quantum mechanics now become needed to describe the behavior of the magnetic moments. Magnetic ions other than dysprosium (Dy) and holmium (Ho) are required to generate a quantum spin ice, with praseodymium (Pr), terbium (Tb) and ytterbium (Yb) being possible candidates. One reason for the interest in quantum spin ice is the belief that these systems may harbor a quantum spin liquid, a state of matter where magnetic moments continue to wiggle (fluctuate) down to absolute zero temperature. The theory describing the low-temperature and low-energy properties of quantum spin ice is akin to that of vacuum quantum electrodynamics, or QED. This constitutes an example of the idea of emergence.

== Artificial spin ices ==
Artificial spin ices are metamaterials consisting of coupled nanomagnets arranged on periodic and aperiodic lattices. These systems have enabled the experimental investigation of a variety of phenomena such as frustration, emergent magnetic monopoles, and phase transitions. In addition, artificial spin ices show potential as reprogrammable magnonic crystals and have been studied for their fast dynamics. A variety of geometries have been explored, including quasicrystalline systems and 3D structures, as well as different magnetic materials to modify anisotropies and blocking temperatures.

For example, polymer magnetic composites comprising 2D lattices of droplets of solid-liquid phase change material, with each droplet containing a single magnetic dipole particle, form an artificial spin ice above the droplet melting point, and, after cooling, a spin glass state with low bulk remanence. Spontaneous emergence of 2D magnetic vortices was observed in such spin ices, which vortex geometries were correlated with the external bulk remanence.

Future work in this field includes further developments in fabrication and characterization methods, exploration of new geometries and material combinations, and potential applications in computation, data storage, and reconfigurable microwave circuits. In 2021 a study demonstrated neuromorphic reservoir computing using artificial spin ice, solving a range of computational tasks using the complex magnetic dynamics of the artificial spin ice. In 2022, another studied achieved an artificial kagome spin ice which could potentially be used in the future for novel high-speed computers with low power consumption.

== See also ==
- Lieb's square ice constant
- Spin glass
- Magnetic monopole
- Magnetricity
