= Dysprosium titanate =

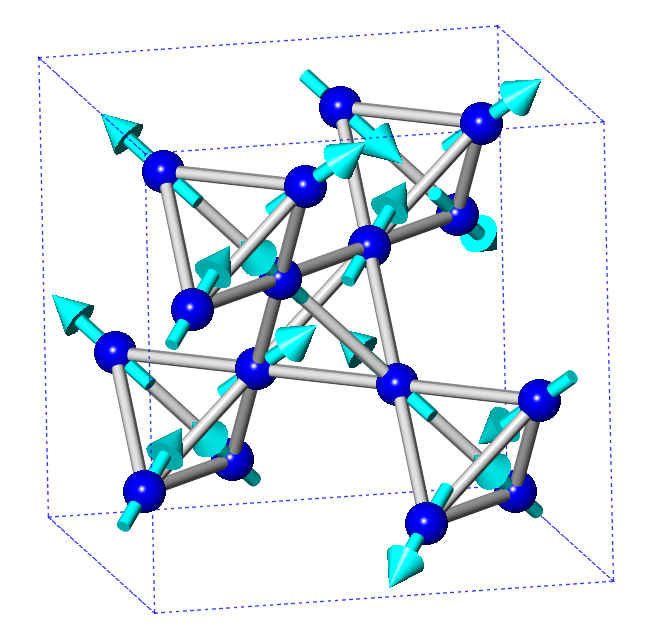

Names
- IUPAC name Dysprosium titanate

Identifiers
CAS Number	68993-46-4
3D model (JSmol)	Interactive image
- InChI: InChI=1S/2Dy.7O.2Ti/q2*+3;7*-2;2*+4
- SMILES: [Dy+3].[Dy+3].[Ti+4].[Ti+4].[O-2].[O-2].[O-2].[O-2].[O-2].[O-2].[O-2]

Properties
Chemical formula	Dy_{2}O_{7}Ti_{2}
Molar mass	532.727 g·mol^{−1}
Density	6.8 g/cm^{3}

Structure
Crystal structure	Pyrochlore
Space group	Fd3̅m, cF88, No. 227
Lattice constant	a = 1.0136 nm
Formula units (Z)	8

Related compounds
Other cations	Holmium titanate
- Except where otherwise noted, data are given for materials in their standard state (at 25 °C [77 °F], 100 kPa). Infobox references

Dysprosium titanate (Dy_{2}Ti_{2}O_{7} or Dy_{2}TiO_{5}) is an inorganic compound, specifically a ceramic of the titanate family. Two common phases of this compound exist with differing properties: Dy_{2}Ti_{2}O_{7} and Dy_{2}TiO_{5}. Dysprosium titanate is commonly used throughout the nuclear industry in nuclear control rods and as a host for nuclear waste.

== History ==
Dysprosium titanate was one of the first materials that was discovered to be a spin ice, along with holmium titanate (Ho_{2}Ti_{2}O_{7}), in 1997. The existence of these materials was predicted by Linus Pauling in 1935, but neutron scattering experiments confirmed their existence as holmium titanate satisfied the model.

Since its discovery as a spin ice, dysprosium titanate has continued to be a focus of research because the magnetic frustration that results from its pyrochlore lattice. In 2009, quasiparticles resembling magnetic monopoles were observed at low temperature and high magnetic field through neutron-scattering experiments. The study demonstrated the existence of Dirac strings in dysprosium titanate and the presence of monopole characteristics at low temperatures.

== Structure ==
The Dy_{2}Ti_{2}O_{7} phase exhibits a cubic pyrochlore structure where the Dy^{3+} ions form a network of corner-sharing tetrahedra. It is notable for its ability to withstand structural change in the presence of radiation from high energy ions.

Dy_{2}Ti_{2}O_{7} can be "stuffed" by adding additional lanthanide atoms into the pyrochlore to generate Dy_{2}TiO_{5}. In this instance, Dy^{3+} is 5-coordinated with oxygen, which produces an orthorhombic structure in the Dy_{2}TiO_{5} phase. This phase also possesses a large neutron absorption cross section, which makes it desirable for various nuclear applications. This can, however, pose difficulties when characterizing this compound through the use of neutron diffraction.

== Synthesis ==
Dysprosium titanate can be synthesized using various methods. The traditional synthesis process involve high-frequency induction melting of dysprosium oxide and titania in a cooled crucible. Sol-gel synthesis has also been utilized as a method to produce the compound in powder form. More recent developments have displayed the viability of mechanochemical processes using anatase and dysprosium oxide as reagents to produce dysprosium titanate nanopowders.

== Uses and Applications ==
Dysprosium titanate has become a desirable material in nuclear industry because of various properties. The compound has a large neutron absorption cross-section, low thermal expansion, high heat capacity, high radiation resistance, and a high melting point, all of which make dysprosium titanate a favorable material to use in control rods for nuclear reactors.

Specifically, this material is used in the control rods for industrial thermal neutron reactors such as the VVER-1000 reactor type.
