= Residual entropy =

Entropy of a substance near absolute zero

Residual entropy is the difference in entropy between a non-equilibrium state and crystal state of a substance close to absolute zero. This term is used in condensed matter physics to describe the entropy at zero kelvin of a glass or plastic crystal referred to the crystal state, whose entropy is zero according to the third law of thermodynamics. It occurs if a material can exist in many different states when cooled. The most common non-equilibrium state is vitreous state, glass.

A common example is the case of carbon monoxide, which has a very small dipole moment. As the carbon monoxide crystal is cooled to absolute zero, few of the carbon monoxide molecules have enough time to align themselves into a perfect crystal (with all of the carbon monoxide molecules oriented in the same direction). Because of this, the crystal is locked into a state with $2^N$ different corresponding microstates, giving a residual entropy of $S=Nk\ln(2)=nR\ln(2)$, rather than zero.

Another example is any amorphous solid (glass). These have residual entropy, because the atom-by-atom microscopic structure can be arranged in a huge number of different ways across a macroscopic system.

The residual entropy has a somewhat special significance compared to other residual properties, in that it has a role in the framework of residual entropy scaling, which is used to compute transport coefficients (coefficients governing non-equilibrium phenomena) directly from the equilibrium property residual entropy, which can be computed directly from any equation of state.

== History ==
One of the first examples of residual entropy was pointed out by Pauling to describe water ice. In water, each oxygen atom is bonded to two hydrogen atoms. However, when water freezes it forms a tetragonal structure where each oxygen atom has four hydrogen neighbors (due to neighboring water molecules). The hydrogen atoms sitting between the oxygen atoms have some degree of freedom as long as each oxygen atom has two hydrogen atoms that are 'nearby', thus forming the traditional H_{2}O water molecule. However, it turns out that for a large number of water molecules in this configuration, the hydrogen atoms have a large number of possible configurations that meet the 2-in 2-out rule (each oxygen atom must have two 'near' (or 'in') hydrogen atoms, and two far (or 'out') hydrogen atoms). This freedom exists down to absolute zero, which was previously seen as an absolute one-of-a-kind configuration. The existence of these multiple configurations (choices for each H of orientation along O--O axis) that meet the rules of absolute zero (2-in 2-out for each O) amounts to randomness, or in other words, entropy. Thus systems that can take multiple configurations at or near absolute zero are said to have residual entropy.

Although water ice was the first material for which residual entropy was proposed, it is generally very difficult to prepare pure defect-free crystals of water ice for studying. A great deal of research has thus been undertaken into finding other systems that exhibit residual entropy. Geometrically frustrated systems in particular often exhibit residual entropy. An important example is spin ice, which is a geometrically frustrated magnetic material where the magnetic moments of the magnetic atoms have Ising-like magnetic spins and lie on the corners of network of corner-sharing tetrahedra. This material is thus analogous to water ice, with the exception that the spins on the corners of the tetrahedra can point into or out of the tetrahedra, thereby producing the same 2-in, 2-out rule as in water ice, and therefore the same residual entropy. One of the interesting properties of geometrically frustrated magnetic materials such as spin ice is that the level of residual entropy can be controlled by the application of an external magnetic field. This property can be used to create one-shot refrigeration systems.

== See also ==
- Proton disorder in ice
- Ice rules
- Geometrical frustration
