= Residual entropy scaling =

Framework for modeling transport phenomena

Residual entropy scaling, also known as excess entropy scaling, is a framework for modelling transport properties, such as the viscosity, thermal conductivity, and diffusion coefficients of fluids. The field was born with the observation by Yasha Rosenfeld in 1977 that these transport properties, when properly scaled, are monovariate functions of the residual entropy. The practical consequence of this observation is that the transport properties at one thermodynamic state point can be predicted from those at another, provided the states have the same residual entropy. This drastically reduces the number of experiments that must be conducted in order to map the transport properties of a fluid.

== Initial discovery and traction ==
After Rosenfeld's initial discovery in 1977, the concept of residual entropy scaling received little attention, and some criticism, which was acknowledged as accurate by Rosenfeld. By 2002, the original paper presenting residual entropy scaling had received less than twenty citations. However, the framework gradually gained traction, and by the 2020s it has become an active field of research.

== Theoretical justification ==
While the initial discovery of residual entropy scaling by Rosenfeld was an empirical one, later research has attempted to justify the framework theoretically. For this purpose, isomorph theory has gained interest. This theory provides insight into the reason for the "hidden scale invariance" seen in residual entropy scaling, as well as the limitations of the theory.

== Mathematical formulation ==
We define the residual entropy, $s^{\mathrm{res}}$, of a fluid defined as

$s^{\mathrm{res}}(T, \rho) = s(T, \rho) - s^{\mathrm{id}}(T, \rho)$,

where $T$ is the temperature, $\rho$ is the molar density, $s^{\mathrm{id}}$ is the ideal-gas entropy, and $s$ is the entropy of the fluid. A transport property $Y$, such as the viscosity or thermal conductivity can scaled to a dimensionless form using macroscopic properties, with a scaling like

$\hat{Y} = f(Y; T, \rho)$,

with $\hat{Y}$ dimensionless. For many fluids, the scaled transport property is then, to a good approximation, a monovariate function of the residual entropy, such that we have

$\hat{Y} = g(s^{\mathrm{res}})$.

The functional form of $g$ can be determined experimentally or from simulations. Once this function is determined, the transport property can be predicted at any thermodynamic state as

$Y(T, \rho) = f^{-1}(\hat{Y}(s^{\mathrm{res}}(T, \rho)))$,

provided that an accurate equation of state is available for calculation of the residual entropy.

=== Example: Viscosity ===
A wide range of scaling functions $f$ have been proposed for different transport properties. One example is the original scaling proposed by Rosenfeld for the viscosity, which gives the scaled viscosity

$\hat{\eta} = \frac{\eta }{\rho_N^{2 / 3} \sqrt{m k_\mathrm{B} T}}$,

where $\eta$ is the shear viscosity, $\rho_N$ is the particle density, $m$ is the particle mass, and $k_\mathrm{B}$ is the Boltzmann constant.

== Limitations ==
While residual entropy scaling has gained significant traction in recent years, its practical application is limited by the fact that the form of the monovariate function $g(s^\mathrm{res})$ must be determined either experimentally or from simulations. Still, residual entropy scaling has proven itself as a useful tool for correlation of experimental measurements, and as a basis for developing mixing rules.
