= Holmium titanate =

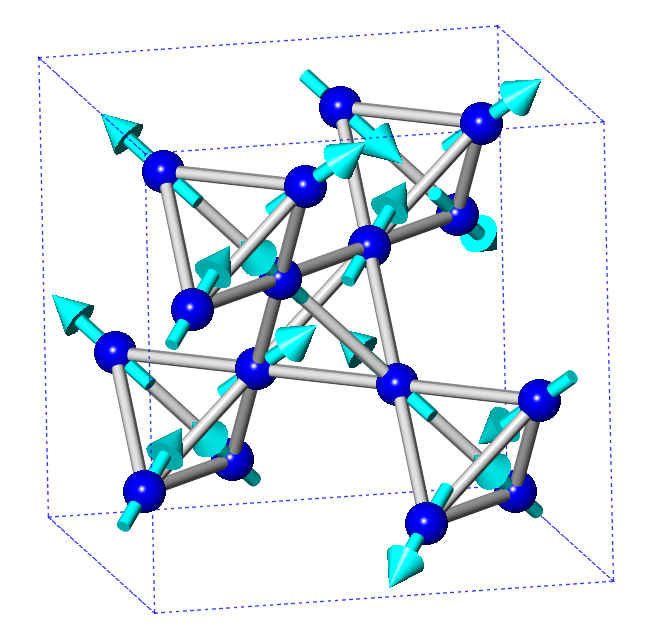

Names
- IUPAC name Holmium titanate

Identifiers
CAS Number	12351-44-9
3D model (JSmol)	Interactive image
- InChI: InChI=1S/2Ho.7O.2Ti/q2*+3;7*-2;2*+4 Key: ZIXFOWKXQHXOAT-UHFFFAOYSA-N
- SMILES: [Ho+3].[Ho+3].[Ti+4].[Ti+4].[O-2].[O-2].[O-2].[O-2].[O-2].[O-2].[O-2]

Properties
Chemical formula	Ho_{2}O_{7}Ti_{2}
Molar mass	537.588 g·mol^{−1}
Density	6.93 g/cm^{3}

Structure
Crystal structure	Pyrochlore
Space group	Fd3̅m, cF88, No. 227
Lattice constant	a = 1.0099 nm
Formula units (Z)	8

Hazards
- GHS labelling
Pictograms	(GHS07: Exclamation mark)
Signal word	Warning
Hazard statements	H351
Precautionary statements	P201, P202, P280, P308+P313, P405, P501

Related compounds
Other cations	Dysprosium titanate
- Except where otherwise noted, data are given for materials in their standard state (at 25 °C [77 °F], 100 kPa). Infobox references

Holmium titanate is an inorganic compound with the chemical formula Ho_{2}Ti_{2}O_{7}.

Holmium titanate is a spin ice material like dysprosium titanate and holmium stannate.
