= Yasha Rosenfeld =

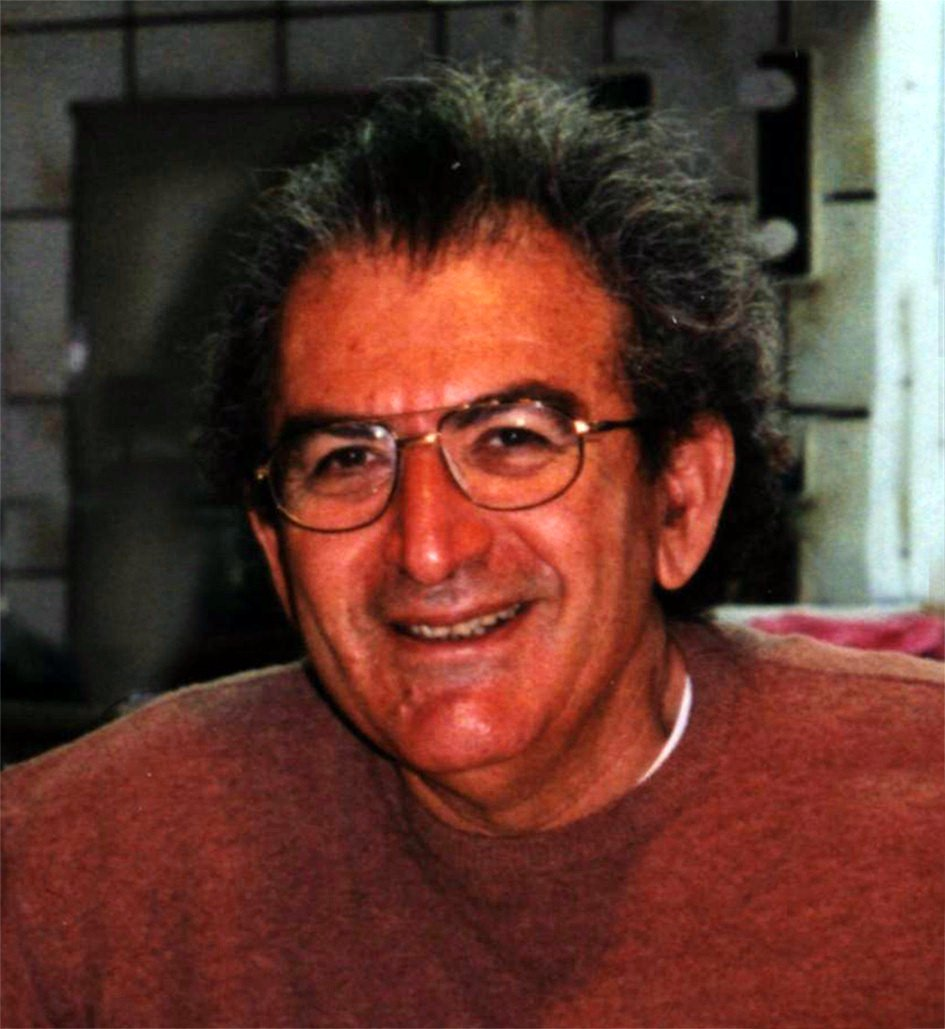

Yaakov (Yasha) Rosenfeld (Hebrew: יעקב (יאשה) רוזנפלד; February 16, 1948 – July 21, 2002) was a condensed-matter theorist who made outstanding contributions to the statistical mechanics of liquids and dense plasmas. He was a leading figure in theories of liquids and his fundamental measure approach to classical density functional theory has been a very significant contribution to the subject. He was is also attributed with founding the field of residual entropy scaling. He received the Humboldt Prize, which is Germany's highest research award for foreign scientists and scholars in all disciplines.

He was born in Harbin, China to Rosa and Yehiel Rosenfeld. When he was two years of age the family immigrated to Israel, where he grew up. Yasha died in 2002 from lung cancer at the age of 54.
