= Pyrochlore =

Niobium mineral of A2B2O7 general formula

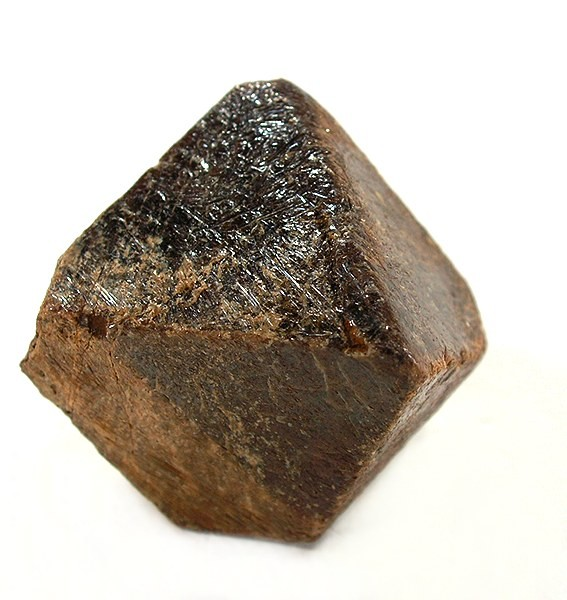
- Pyrochlore from Russia

General
- Category: Oxide mineral
- Formula: (Na,Ca)_{2}Nb_{2}O_{6}(OH,F)
- IMA symbol: Pcl
- Strunz classification: 4.DH.15
- Dana classification: 08.02.01.01; Pyrochlore group
- Crystal system: Isometric
- Crystal class: Hexoctahedral (m3̅m); H-M symbol: (4/m 3̅ 2/m)
- Space group: Fd3̅m (No. 227)
- Unit cell: a = 10.41(6) Å, Z = 8

Identification
- Color: Black to brown, chocolate-brown, reddish brown, amber-orange, red-orange
- Crystal habit: Typically octahedra, disseminated granular, massive
- Twinning: 111 rare
- Cleavage: 111 indistinct, may be a parting.
- Fracture: Subconchoidal to uneven, splintery
- Tenacity: Brittle
- Mohs scale hardness: 5.0–5.5
- Luster: Vitreous to resinous
- Streak: White
- Diaphaneity: Subtranslucent to opaque
- Specific gravity: 4.45 to 4.90
- Optical properties: Isotropic, weak anomalous anisotropism
- Refractive index: n = 1.9–2.2
- Other characteristics: Radioactive, often metamict

Pyrochlore (Na,Ca)_{2}Nb_{2}O_{6}(OH,F) is a mineral group, the niobium end member of the pyrochlore supergroup, as well as the name for a wide variety of isostructural materials with the crystal structure Fd3̅m.

== Mineral ==
The mineral is associated with the metasomatic end stages of magmatic intrusions. Pyrochlore crystals are usually well-formed (euhedral), occurring usually as octahedra of a yellowish or brownish color and resinous luster. It is commonly metamict due to radiation damage from included radioactive elements.

Pyrochlore occurs in pegmatites associated with nepheline syenites and other alkalic rocks. It is also found in granite pegmatites and greisens. It is characteristically found in carbonatites. Associated minerals include zircon, aegirine, apatite, perovskite and columbite.

=== History ===
It was first described in 1826 for an occurrence in Stavern (Fredriksvärn), Vestfold, Norway. The name is from the Greek πῦρ, fire, and χλωρός, green because it typically turns green on ignition in classic blowpipe analysis.

=== Niobium mining ===
The three largest producers of niobium ore are mining pyrochlore deposits. The largest deposit in Brazil is the CBMM mine located south of Araxá, Minas Gerais, followed by the deposit of the Catalão mine east of Catalão, Goiás. The third largest deposit of niobium ore is Niobec mine west of Saint-Honoré near Chicoutimi, Quebec.

Pyrochlore ore typically contains greater than 0.05% of naturally occurring radioactive uranium and thorium.

Lueshe in North Kivu, Democratic Republic of Congo, has substantial deposits of pyrochlore.

== Crystal structure ==
The formulas,A_{2}B_{2}O_{6} and A_{2}B_{2}O_{7} (where A and B are metals; for example, Y_{2}Ti_{2}O_{7}) represent a family of phases isostructural to the mineral pyrochlore. Pyrochlores are an important class of materials in diverse technological applications such as luminescence, ionic conductivity, nuclear waste immobilization, high-temperature thermal barrier coatings, automobile exhaust gas control, catalysts, solid oxide fuel cell, ionic/electrical conductors etc.

The pyrochlore structure is a super structure derivative of the simple fluorite structure (AO_{2} = A_{4}O_{8}), where the A and B cations are ordered along the ⟨110⟩ direction. The additional anion vacancy resides in the tetrahedral interstice between adjacent B-site cations. These systems are particularly susceptible to geometrical frustration and novel magnetic effects.

The pyrochlore structure shows varied physical properties spanning electronic insulators (e.g. La_{2}Zr_{2}O_{7}), ionic conductors (Gd_{1.9}Ca_{0.1}Ti_{2}O_{6.9}), metallic conductors (Bi_{2}Ru_{2}O_{7−y}), mixed ionic and electronic conductors, spin ice systems (Dy_{2}Ti_{2}O_{7}), spin glass systems (Y_{2}Mo_{2}O_{7}), haldane chain systems (Tl_{2}Ru_{2}O_{7}) and superconducting materials (Cd_{2}Re_{2}O_{7}). More disordered structures, such as the bismuth pyrochlores, have also been investigated due to interesting high-frequency dielectric properties.

The crystal structure has been investigated for use in solid electrolytes for lithium iron batteries. It is alleged to provide high conductivity while inhibiting dendrite growth.

== See also ==
- List of minerals
