= 1987 in science =

The year 1987 in science and technology involved many significant events, some listed below.

== Astronomy ==
- February 23 – Supernova 1987a is observed, the first "naked-eye" supernova since 1604.
- Asteroid 7816 Hanoi is discovered by Masahiro Koishikawa.
- 10500 Nishi-koen is discovered.

== Biochemistry ==
- December – Yoshizumi Ishino discovers the DNA sequence of CRISPR.
- Piotr Chomczynski and Nicoletta Sacchi publish their acid guanidinium thiocyanate-phenol-chloroform extraction protocol.

== Computing ==
- Larry Wall releases the first version of the Perl programming language via the comp.sources.misc newsgroup.
- HyperCard is released by Apple Inc., an early example of hypermedia which inspires the World Wide Web.
- Thomas Knoll and John Knoll develop the first version of Photoshop.

== Genetics ==
- November 6 – Florida rapist Tommie Lee Andrews is the first person to be convicted as a result of DNA fingerprinting.

== History of science ==
- Robert V. Bruce publishes The Launching of Modern American Science, 1846–1876.

== Mathematics ==
- Gödel's ontological proof of the existence of God is published posthumously.
- The Abelian sandpile model, the first discovered example of a dynamical system displaying self-organized criticality, is published by Per Bak, Chao Tang and Kurt Wiesenfeld.

== Medicine ==
- March 20 – The United States Food and Drug Administration for the first time approves an antiretroviral drug for the treatment of HIV/AIDS, zidovudine, also known as AZT (azidothymidine) or Retrovir.
- May – The name chronic fatigue syndrome first appears in the medical literature.
- May 11 – The first heart-lung transplant takes place.
- August 31 – The FDA for the first time approves a statin, lovastatin.
- September 5 - The first successful surgical separation of craniopagus twins is done by Dr. Ben Carson.
- December 29 – Prozac makes its debut in the U.S.

== Paleoanthropology ==
- January 1 – The 'Mitochondrial Eve' hypothesis is proposed.

== Paleontology ==
- First fossils of Argentinosaurus found.

== Physics ==
- March 18 – Woodstock of physics, the marathon session of the American Physical Society's meeting featuring 51 presentations concerning the science of high-temperature superconductors.
- Harry J. Lipkin names the pentaquark.

== Technology ==
- December 1 – Channel Tunnel digging commences.
- Maglite introduces the 2AAA Mini Maglite flashlight, targeted for medical and industrial applications.

== Zoology ==
- June 17 – The last known purebred dusky seaside sparrow ("Orange Band"), dies (in Florida).
- Varroa destructor, an invasive parasite of honeybees, is found in the United States.

== Awards ==
- Nobel Prizes
  - Physics – J. Georg Bednorz, Karl Alexander Müller
  - Chemistry – Donald J. Cram, Jean-Marie Lehn, Charles J. Pedersen
  - Medicine – Susumu Tonegawa
- Turing Award – John Cocke
- Wollaston Medal for Geology – Claude Jean Allègre

== Births ==
- June 10 – James Maynard, English mathematician

== Deaths ==
- March 19 – Louis de Broglie (b. 1892), French physicist and winner of the Nobel Prize in Physics (1929).
- March 26 – Gwyn Macfarlane (b. 1907), British hematologist.
- October 2 – Peter Medawar (b. 1915), British immunologist and winner of the Nobel Prize in Physiology or Medicine (1960).
- October 13 – Walter Houser Brattain (b. 1902), American physicist.
- October 20 – Andrey Kolmogorov (b. 1903), Russian mathematician.
- December 2 – Yakov Borisovich Zel'dovich (b. 1914), Belarusian astrophysicist.
- December 7 – Helen Porter (b. 1899), English plant physiologist.
