= Walter Selke =

German physicist

- Born: 11 May 1947; Hannover, Germany
- Died: 22 December 2023 (aged 76); Burgwedel, Germany
- Scientific career
- Fields: Theoretical Physics
- Workplaces: RWTH Aachen

Walter Selke (11 May 1947 – 22 December 2023) was a German professor for Theoretical Physics at the RWTH Aachen.

== Career ==
After receiving his doctoral degree at the Leibniz University Hannover, followed by postdoctoral positions at the Saarland University, Cornell University, and Boston University, he became a permanent scientific staff member of Forschungszentrum Jülich in 1981. He held a similar position at the IBM Research Center (Zürich) in 1985–1986. In 1996 Selke became a university professor at the RWTH Aachen, and from 2008 was engaged in the Jülich Aachen Research Alliance (JARA). He retired from his teaching duties in 2012.

Selke's main field of expertise was statistical physics, with applications especially, to magnetism and surface physics. He was best known for his work on commensurate and incommensurate spatially modulated superstructures in solids, with realizations in magnets, ferroelectrics, alloys and adsorbate systems.

Selke published about 150 scientific papers in journals, conference proceedings, monographs and books, including many review articles. Among his coauthors are Kurt Binder, Michael E. Fisher, and Valery Pokrovsky. He organized and co-organized several workshops and conferences, such as a series of meetings in the years 1988 to 1997 with physicists from the Landau Institute for Theoretical Physics, which took place alternately in Germany and Russia.

From 1997 to 2000 he was member of the editorial board of the Journal of Statistical Physics. In the inaugural year 2008 he was named an 'Outstanding Referee' by the American Physical Society. In 2009, he held a guest professorship at the University of New South Wales.

== Publications ==
- M.E. Fisher and W. Selke (1980). "Infinitely many commensurate phases in a simple Ising model". Phys. Rev. Lett. 44 (23): 1502–1505. Bibcode:1980PhRvL..44.1502F. doi:10.1103/PhysRevLett.44.1502.
- W. Selke (1988). "The ANNNI model—Theoretical analysis and experimental application". Physics Reports. 170 (4): 213–264. Bibcode:1988PhR...170..213S. doi:10.1016/0370-1573(88)90140-8.
- J.-S. Wang, W. Selke, Vl.S. Dotsenko, and V.B. Andreichenko (1990). "The critical behaviour of the two-dimensional dilute Ising magnet". Physica A. 164 (2): 221–239. Bibcode:1990PhyA..164..221W. doi:10.1016/0378-4371(90)90196-Y.
- Selke, W. (1992). Domb, C.; Lebowitz, J.L. (eds.). "Spatially Modulated Structures in Systems with Competing Interactions"". Phase Transitions and Critical Phenomena. 15: 1–72. ISBN 0122203151.
