= Critical brain hypothesis =

Hypothesis that states certain biological neuronal networks work near phase transitions

In neuroscience, the critical brain hypothesis states that certain biological neuronal networks work near phase transitions. Experimental recordings from large groups of neurons have shown bursts of activity, so-called neuronal avalanches, with sizes that follow a power law distribution. These results, and subsequent replication on a number of settings, led to the hypothesis that the collective dynamics of large neuronal networks in the brain operates close to the critical point of a phase transition. According to this hypothesis, the activity of the brain would be continuously transitioning between two phases, one in which activity will rapidly reduce and die, and another where activity will build up and amplify over time. In criticality, the brain capacity for information processing is enhanced, so subcritical, critical and slightly supercritical branching process of thoughts could describe how human and animal minds function.

== History ==
Discussion on the brain's criticality have been done since 1950, with the paper on the imitation game for a Turing test. In 1995, Andreas V. Herz and John Hopfield noted that self-organized criticality (SOC) models for earthquakes were mathematically equivalent to networks of integrate-and-fire neurons, and speculated that perhaps SOC would occur in the brain. Simultaneously Dimitris Stassinopoulos and Per Bak proposed a simple neural network model working at criticality which was expanded later by Dante R. Chialvo and Bak. In 2003, the hypothesis found experimental support by John M. Beggs and Dietmar Plenz. The critical brain hypothesis is not a consensus among the scientific community. However, there exists more and more support for the hypothesis as more experimenters take to verifying the claims that it makes, particularly in vivo in rats with chronic electrophysiological recordings , mice with high-density electrophysiological recordings as well as human functional magnetic resonance imaging.
