= Sand pile =

Sand pile may refer to:

- A pile of sand
- Abelian sandpile model
- Sand drag
