= Self-organized criticality control =

Control of processes by which a self-organized system dissipates energy

In applied physics, the concept of controlling self-organized criticality refers to the control of processes by which a self-organized system dissipates energy. The objective of the control is to reduce the probability of occurrence of and size of energy dissipation bursts, often called avalanches, of self-organized systems. Dissipation of energy in a self-organized critical system into a lower energy state can be costly for society, since it depends on avalanches of all sizes usually following a kind of power law distribution and large avalanches can be damaging and disruptive.

== Schemes ==
Several strategies have been proposed to deal with the issue of controlling self-organized criticality:

1. The design of controlled avalanches. Daniel O. Cajueiro and Roberto F. S. Andrade show that if well-formulated small and medium avalanches are exogenously triggered in the system, the energy of the system is released in a way that large avalanches are rarer.
2. The modification of the degree of interdependence of the network where the avalanche spreads. Charles D. Brummitt, Raissa M. D'Souza and E. A. Leicht show that the dynamics of self-organized critical systems on complex networks depend on connectivity of the complex network. They find that while some connectivity is beneficial (since it suppresses the largest cascades in the system), too much connectivity gives space for the development of very large cascades and increases the size of capacity of the system.
3. The modification of the deposition process of the self-organized system. Pierre-Andre Noel, Charles D. Brummitt and Raissa M. D'Souza show that it is possible to control the self-organized system by modifying the natural deposition process of the self-organized system adjusting the place where the avalanche starts.
4. Dynamically modifying the local thresholds of cascading failures. In a model of an electric transmission network, Heiko Hoffmann and David W. Payton demonstrated that either randomly upgrading lines (sort of like preventive maintenance) or upgrading broken lines to a random breakage threshold suppresses self-organized criticality. Apparently, these strategies undermine the self-organization of large critical clusters. Here, a critical cluster is a collection of transmission lines that are near the failure threshold and that collapse entirely if triggered.

== Applications ==
There are several events that arise in nature or society and that these ideas of control may help to avoid:

1. Flood caused by systems of dams and reservoirs or interconnected valleys.
2. Snow avalanches that take place in snow hills.
3. Forest fires in areas susceptible to a lightning bolt or a match lighting.
4. Cascades of load shedding that take place in power grids (a type of power outage). The OPA model is used to study different techniques for criticality control.
5. Cascading failure in the internet switching fabric.
6. Ischemic cascades, a series of biochemical reactions releasing toxins during moments of inadequate blood supply.
7. Systemic risk in financial systems.
8. Excursions in nuclear energy systems.
9. Earthquakes and induced seismicity.

The failure cascades in electrical transmission and financial sectors occur because economic forces that push for efficiency cause these systems to operate near a critical point, where avalanches of indeterminate size become possible. Financial investments that are vulnerable to this kind of failure may exhibit a Taleb distribution.

== See also ==
- Abelian sandpile model
- Complex networks
- Self-organized criticality
