= Quantitative Biology (journal) =

Quarterly academic journal

- Discipline: Mathematics & Computational biology; Quantitative biology
- Language: English
- Edited by: Chao Tang and Xuegong Zhang

Publication details
- History: 2013 – present
- Publisher: Wiley and Higher Education Press
- Frequency: Quarterly
- Open access: Yes
- Impact factor: 1.4 (2024)

Standard abbreviations
- ISO 4: Quant. Biol.

Indexing
- ISSN: 2095-4689 (print); 2095-4697 (web)

Links
- Journal homepage (Wiley Online Library); Journal homepage (HEP journals); Submission

Quantitative Biology is a quarterly peer-reviewed open-access interdisciplinary scientific journal covering experimental biology, theoretical biology, computational biology, bioinformatics, systems biology, synthetic biology, and digital and AI biology.

The journal was established in 2013 by Higher Education Press and Tsinghua University. The co-founding editors-in-chief were Michael Q. Zhang and Chao Tang. As of 2019, the editors-in-chief were Chao Tang and Xuegong Zhang.

Before 2020, Quantitative Biology was co-published by Higher Education Press and Springer Nature. As of 2023, it was published by Higher Education Press and Wiley.

According to the Journal Citation Reports and Scopus, the journal had a 2024 impact factor of 1.4, and a 2024 CiteScore of 2.0, respectively.

== Abstracting and indexing ==
The journal is abstracted and indexed in:

- Emerging Sources Citation Index (ESCI)
- Scopus
- Biological Abstracts
- BIOSIS
- Chemical Abstracts Service
- Embase
