= Mogens Høgh Jensen =

Danish physicist

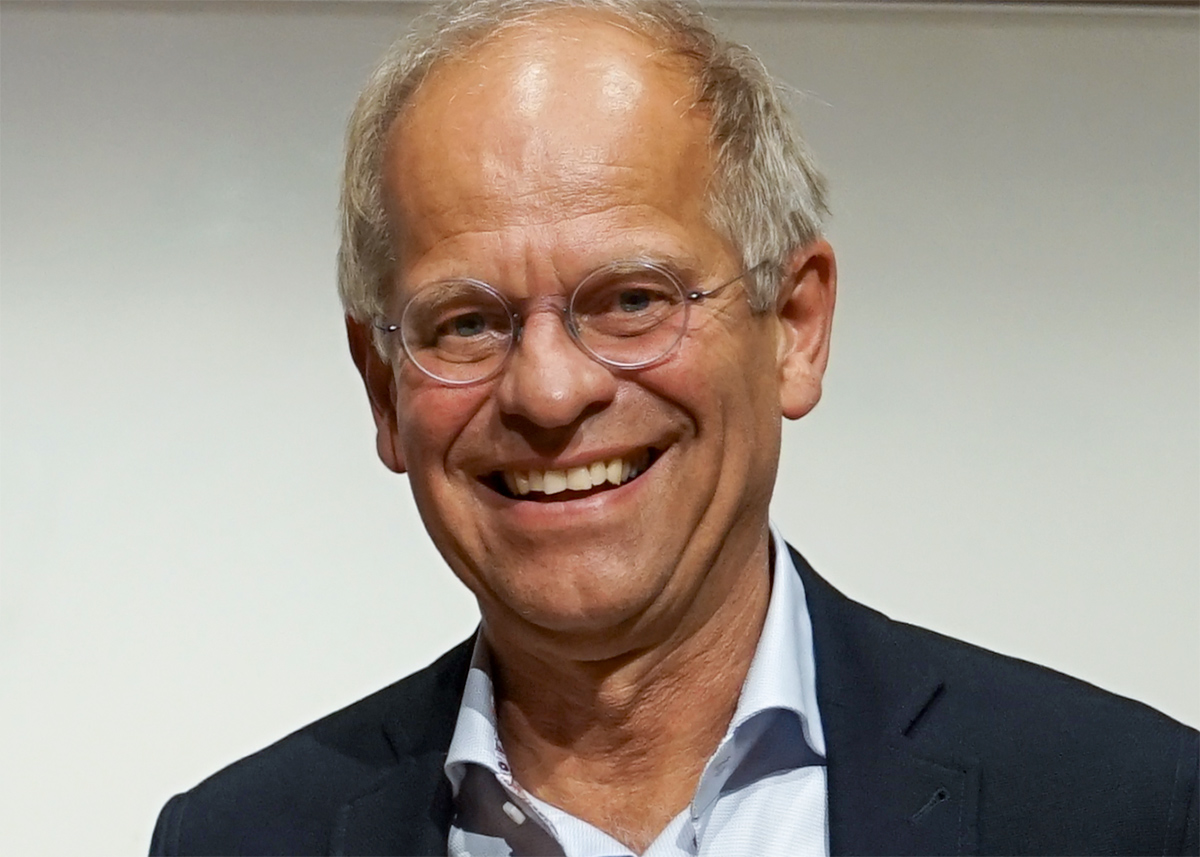
- Mogens Høgh Jensen (2019)
- Born: 2 March 1955 (age 71); Vig, Denmark
- Education: University of Copenhagen
- Known for: Multi fractals, theory of coupled oscillators, chaos theory
- Awards: Gunnar Randers Prize (2011)
- Scientific career
- Fields: Theoretical physics
- Workplaces: University of Chicago; Niels Bohr Institute
- Doctoral advisor: Per Bak, Leo Kadanoff

Mogens Høgh Jensen (born 2 March 1955) is a Danish physicist who has made contributions to the fields of complex dynamics and fractals. He currently holds a professorship at the Niels Bohr Institute, University of Copenhagen and is the former president and secretary general of the Royal Danish Academy of Science and Letters.

He received his master's degree in 1981, with professor Per Bak as supervisor. His master project was about “Theory of Helical Magnetic Structure and Phase Transitions” which was later devoted a chapter in L. D. Landau and E. M. Lifshitz, ”Electrodynamics of Continuous Media” (Chap. 52).

During his PhD he worked on studies of chaos and fractal dimensions and with Per Bak and Tomas Bohr he discovered universal scaling structure of mode locking between two frequencies at the onset of chaos.

Following his PhD in 1984, he continued his academic career as a postdoc at the James Franck Institute in Chicago, with Leo Kadanoff as his supervisor. Here he contributed to a series of highly influential papers, and most notably he played a key part in the development of multi fractals.

He later worked on fully developed turbulence and together with Giovanni Paladin and Angelo Vulpiani he pioneered the study of intermittency correction in term of shell models. He was the head of ‘Center for Chaos and Turbulence Studies: CATS’ before he in 2004 he became the director of ‘BioNET: Danish Center for Biophysics’. Since then he has mainly worked on problems in biological physics, in particular protein oscillations inside cells.

He has received several prizes most notably the Norwegian physics prize ‘Gunnar Randers’ handed over in 2011 by King Harald V of Norway.

He has been visiting professor at the Universities in Chicago, Rome, Fukuoka and Harvard.

Mogens Høgh Jensen has been at a member of the Royal Danish Academy of Science and Letters since 2000, its secretary general in the period 2012–2016 and the president since 2016. He was knighted by Queen Margrethe II in 2017.
