= Maya Paczuski =

Physicist

- מאיה פצ'וסקי
- Born: April 7, 1963 (age 63); Tel-Aviv, Israel
- Education: Massachusetts Institute of Technology
- Scientific career
- Fields: Physics
- Workplaces: University of Calgary
- Doctoral advisor: Mehran Kardar

Maya Paczuski (Hebrew: מאיה פצ'וסקי; born April 7, 1963) is the head and founder of the Complexity Science Group at the University of Calgary. She is a well-cited physicist whose work spans self-organized criticality, avalanche dynamics, earthquake, and complex networks. She was born in Israel in 1963 but grew up in the United States. Maya Paczuski received a B.S. and M.S. in Electrical Engineering and Computer Science from M.I.T. in 1986 and then went on to study with Mehran Kardar, earning her Ph.D. in Condensed matter physics from the same institute.

Before founding the Complexity Science Group at the University of Calgary, she held appointments at numerous institutions around the world, most notably, M.I.T., Brookhaven National Laboratory, the Niels Bohr Institute (Copenhagen, Denmark), the University of Houston, NORDITA (Copenhagen, Denmark), Imperial College London, the von Neumann Institute for Computing at Forschungszentrum Jülich, and the Perimeter Institute for Theoretical Physics, where she organized and ran the first complex systems and statistical physics program. Paczuski was married to the late Danish theoretical physicist Per Bak, with whom she has coauthored papers.

== See also ==
- Self-organized criticality
- Geophysics
- Complexity
- Boolean network
- Complex network
- Aftershock

== Selected publications ==
- M. Paczuski; M. Kardar; D.R. Nelson (1988). "Landau Theory of the Crumpling Transition". Physical Review Letters. 60 (25): 2638–2640. Bibcode:1988PhRvL..60.2638P. doi:10.1103/PhysRevLett.60.2638. PMID 10038410.
- M. Paczuski; S. Maslov; P. Bak (1994). "Field-Theory for a Model of Self-Organized Criticality". Europhysics Letters. 27 (2): 97–102. Bibcode:1994EL.....27...97P. doi:10.1209/0295-5075/27/2/004. S2CID 250749474.
- S. Maslov; M. Paczuski; P. Bak (1994). "Avalanches and 1/f Noise in Evolution and Growth-Models". Physical Review Letters. 73 (16): 2162–2165. Bibcode:1994PhRvL..73.2162M. doi:10.1103/PhysRevLett.73.2162. PMID 10056988.
- P. Bak; M. Paczuski (1995). "Complexity, Contingency, and Criticality". Proceedings of the National Academy of Sciences of the United States of America. 92 (15): 6689–6696. Bibcode:1995PNAS...92.6689B. doi:10.1073/pnas.92.15.6689. PMC 41396. PMID 11607561.
- K. Nagel; M. Paczuski (1995). "Emergent Traffic Jams". Physical Review E. 51 (4): 2909–2918. arXiv:adap-org/9502004. Bibcode:1995PhRvE..51.2909N. doi:10.1103/PhysRevE.51.2909. PMID 9962967. S2CID 39590935.
- M. Paczuski; S. Maslov; P. Bak (1996). "Avalanche Dynamics in Evolution, Growth, and Depinning Models". Physical Review E. 53 (1): 414–443. arXiv:adap-org/9510002. Bibcode:1996PhRvE..53..414P. doi:10.1103/PhysRevE.53.414. PMID 9964272. S2CID 10602221.
- M. Paczuski; S. Boettcher (1996). "Universality in Sandpiles, Interface Depinning, and Earthquake Models". Physical Review Letters. 77 (1): 111–114. arXiv:cond-mat/9603120. Bibcode:1996PhRvL..77..111P. doi:10.1103/PhysRevLett.77.111. PMID 10061784. S2CID 17793948.
- P. Bak; M. Paczuski; M. Shubik (1997). "Price Variations in a Stock Market with Many Agents". Physica A. 246 (3–4): 430–453. arXiv:cond-mat/9609144. Bibcode:1997PhyA..246..430B. doi:10.1016/S0378-4371(97)00401-9. S2CID 119480691.
- M. Paczuski; K.E. Bassler; A. Corral (2000). "Self-Organized Networks of Competing Boolean Agents". Physical Review Letters. 69 (14): 3185–3188. arXiv:cond-mat/9905082. Bibcode:2000PhRvL..84.3185P. doi:10.1103/PhysRevLett.84.3185. PMID 11019043. S2CID 27627002.
- M. Baiesi; M. Paczuski (2004). "Scale-free networks of earthquakes and aftershocks". Physical Review E. 84 (6) 066106. arXiv:cond-mat/0309485. Bibcode:2004PhRvE..69f6106B. doi:10.1103/PhysRevE.69.066106. PMID 15244666. S2CID 17260479.
- J. Davidsen; M. Paczuski (2005). "Analysis of the Spatial Distribution Between Successive Earthquakes". Physical Review Letters. 94 (4) 048501. arXiv:cond-mat/0411297. Bibcode:2005PhRvL..94d8501D. doi:10.1103/PhysRevLett.94.048501. PMID 15783608. S2CID 118917829.
- J.G. Foster (2009). "Edge Direction and the Structure of Networks". Proceedings of the National Academy of Sciences of the United States of America. 107 (24): 10815–10820. arXiv:0908.4288. Bibcode:2010PNAS..10710815F. doi:10.1073/pnas.0912671107. PMC 2890716. PMID 20505119.
