= Self-organization =

Process of forming order by local interactions

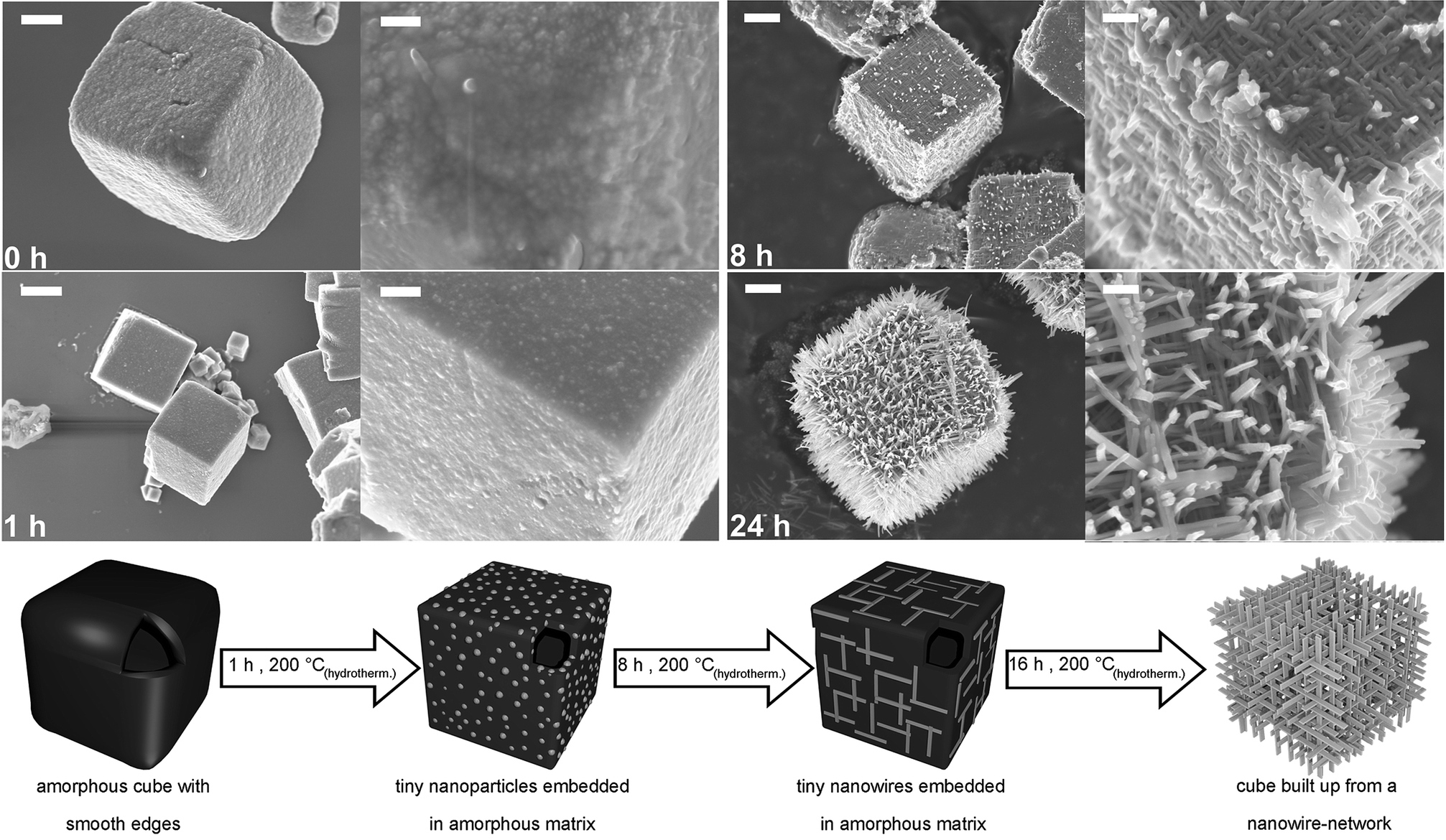
Self-organization in micron-sized Nb_{3}O_{7}(OH) cubes during a hydrothermal treatment at 200 °C. Initially amorphous cubes gradually transform into ordered 3D meshes of crystalline nanowires as summarized in the model below.

Self-organization, also called spontaneous order in the social sciences, is a process where some form of overall order arises from local interactions between parts of an initially disordered system. The process can be spontaneous when sufficient energy is available, not needing control by any external agent. It is often triggered by seemingly random fluctuations, amplified by positive feedback. The resulting organization is wholly decentralized, distributed over all the components of the system. As such, the organization is typically robust and able to survive or self-repair substantial perturbation. Chaos theory discusses self-organization in terms of islands of predictability in a sea of chaotic unpredictability.

Self-organization is a phenomenon that occurs across various fields, including physics, chemistry, biology, collective behavior, ecology, communication networks, robotics, artificial intelligence, linguistics, social science, urbanism, philosophy, and engineering. Examples of self-organization include crystallization, thermal convection of fluids, chemical oscillation, animal swarming, neural circuits, and black markets.

== Overview ==
Self-organization is realized in the physics of non-equilibrium processes, and in chemical reactions, where it is often characterized as self-assembly. The concept has proven useful in biology, from the molecular to the ecosystem level. Cited examples of self-organizing behavior also appear in the literature of many other disciplines, both in the natural sciences and in the social sciences (such as economics or anthropology). Self-organization has also been observed in mathematical systems such as cellular automata. Self-organization is an example of the related concept of emergence.

Self-organization relies on four basic ingredients:

1. strong dynamical non-linearity, often (though not necessarily) involving positive and negative feedback
2. balance of exploitation and exploration
3. multiple interactions among components
4. availability of energy (to overcome the natural tendency toward entropy, or loss of free energy)

== Principles ==
The cybernetician William Ross Ashby formulated the original principle of self-organization in 1947. It states that any deterministic dynamic system automatically evolves towards a state of equilibrium that can be described in terms of an attractor in a basin of surrounding states. Once there, the further evolution of the system is constrained to remain in the attractor. This constraint implies a form of mutual dependency or coordination between its constituent components or subsystems. In Ashby's terms, each subsystem has adapted to the environment formed by all other subsystems.

The cybernetician Heinz von Foerster formulated the principle of "order from noise" in 1960. It notes that self-organization is facilitated by random perturbations ("noise") that let the system explore a variety of states in its state space. This increases the chance that the system will arrive into the basin of a "strong" or "deep" attractor, from which it then quickly enters the attractor itself. The biophysicist Henri Atlan developed this concept by proposing the principle of "complexity from noise" (French: le principe de complexité par le bruit) first in the 1972 book L'organisation biologique et la théorie de l'information and then in the 1979 book Entre le cristal et la fumée. The physicist and chemist Ilya Prigogine formulated a similar principle as "order through fluctuations" or "order out of chaos". It is applied in the method of simulated annealing for problem solving and machine learning.

== History ==
The idea that the dynamics of a system can lead to an increase in its organization has a long history. The ancient atomists such as Democritus and Lucretius believed that a designing intelligence is unnecessary to create order in nature, arguing that given enough time and space and matter, order emerges by itself.

The philosopher René Descartes presents self-organization hypothetically in the fifth part of his 1637 Discourse on Method. He elaborated on the idea in his unpublished work The World. (Note: For related history, see Aram Vartanian, Diderot and Descartes.)

Immanuel Kant used the term "self-organizing" in his 1790 Critique of Judgment, where he argued that teleology is a meaningful concept only if there exists such an entity whose parts or "organs" are simultaneously ends and means. Such a system of organs must be able to behave as if it has a mind of its own, that is, it is capable of governing itself.

In such a natural product as this every part is thought as owing its presence to the agency of all the remaining parts, and also as existing for the sake of the others and of the whole, that is as an instrument, or organ... The part must be an organ producing the other parts—each, consequently, reciprocally producing the others... Only under these conditions and upon these terms can such a product be an organized and self-organized being, and, as such, be called a physical end.

Sadi Carnot (1796–1832) and Rudolf Clausius (1822–1888) discovered the second law of thermodynamics in the 19th century. It states that total entropy, sometimes understood as disorder, will always increase over time in an isolated system. This means that a system cannot spontaneously increase its order without an external relationship that decreases order elsewhere in the system (e.g. through consuming the low-entropy energy of a battery and diffusing high-entropy heat).

18th-century thinkers had sought to understand the "universal laws of form" to explain the observed forms of living organisms. This idea became associated with Lamarckism and fell into disrepute until the early 20th century, when D'Arcy Wentworth Thompson (1860–1948) attempted to revive it.

The psychiatrist and engineer W. Ross Ashby introduced the term "self-organizing" to contemporary science in 1947. It was taken up by the cyberneticians Heinz von Foerster, Gordon Pask, Stafford Beer; and von Foerster organized a conference on "The Principles of Self-Organization" at the University of Illinois' Allerton Park in June, 1960 which led to a series of conferences on Self-Organizing Systems. Norbert Wiener took up the idea in the second edition of his Cybernetics: or Control and Communication in the Animal and the Machine (1961).

Self-organization was associated with general systems theory in the 1960s, but did not become commonplace in the scientific literature until physicists Hermann Haken et al. and complex systems researchers adopted it in a greater picture from cosmology Erich Jantsch, chemistry with dissipative system, biology and sociology as autopoiesis to system thinking in the following 1980s (Santa Fe Institute) and 1990s (complex adaptive system), until our days with the disruptive emerging technologies profounded by a rhizomatic network theory.

Around 2008–2009, a concept of guided self-organization started to take shape. This approach aims to regulate self-organization for specific purposes, so that a dynamical system may reach specific attractors or outcomes. The regulation constrains a self-organizing process within a complex system by restricting local interactions between the system components, rather than following an explicit control mechanism or a global design blueprint. The desired outcomes, such as increases in the resultant internal structure and/or functionality, are achieved by combining task-independent global objectives with task-dependent constraints on local interactions.

== By field ==
=== Physics ===
Convection cells in a gravity field

The many self-organizing phenomena in physics include phase transitions and spontaneous symmetry breaking such as spontaneous magnetization and crystal growth in classical physics, and the laser, superconductivity and Bose–Einstein condensation in quantum physics. Self-organization is found in self-organized criticality in dynamical systems, in tribology, in spin foam systems, and in loop quantum gravity, in plasma, in river basins and deltas, in dendritic solidification (snow flakes), in capillary imbibition and in turbulent structure.

=== Chemistry ===
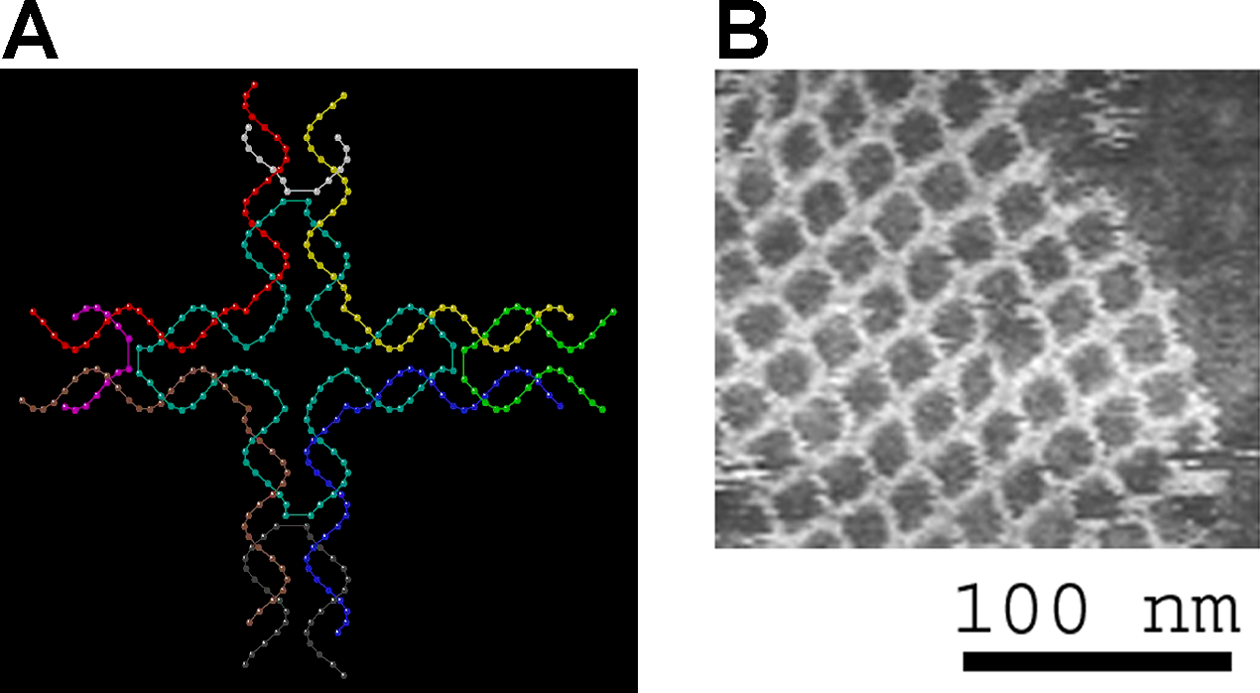
The DNA structure shown schematically at left self-assembles into the structure at right

Self-organization in chemistry includes drying-induced self-assembly, molecular self-assembly, reaction–diffusion systems and oscillating reactions, autocatalytic networks, liquid crystals, grid complexes, colloidal crystals, self-assembled monolayers, micelles, microphase separation of block copolymers, and Langmuir–Blodgett films.

=== Biology ===
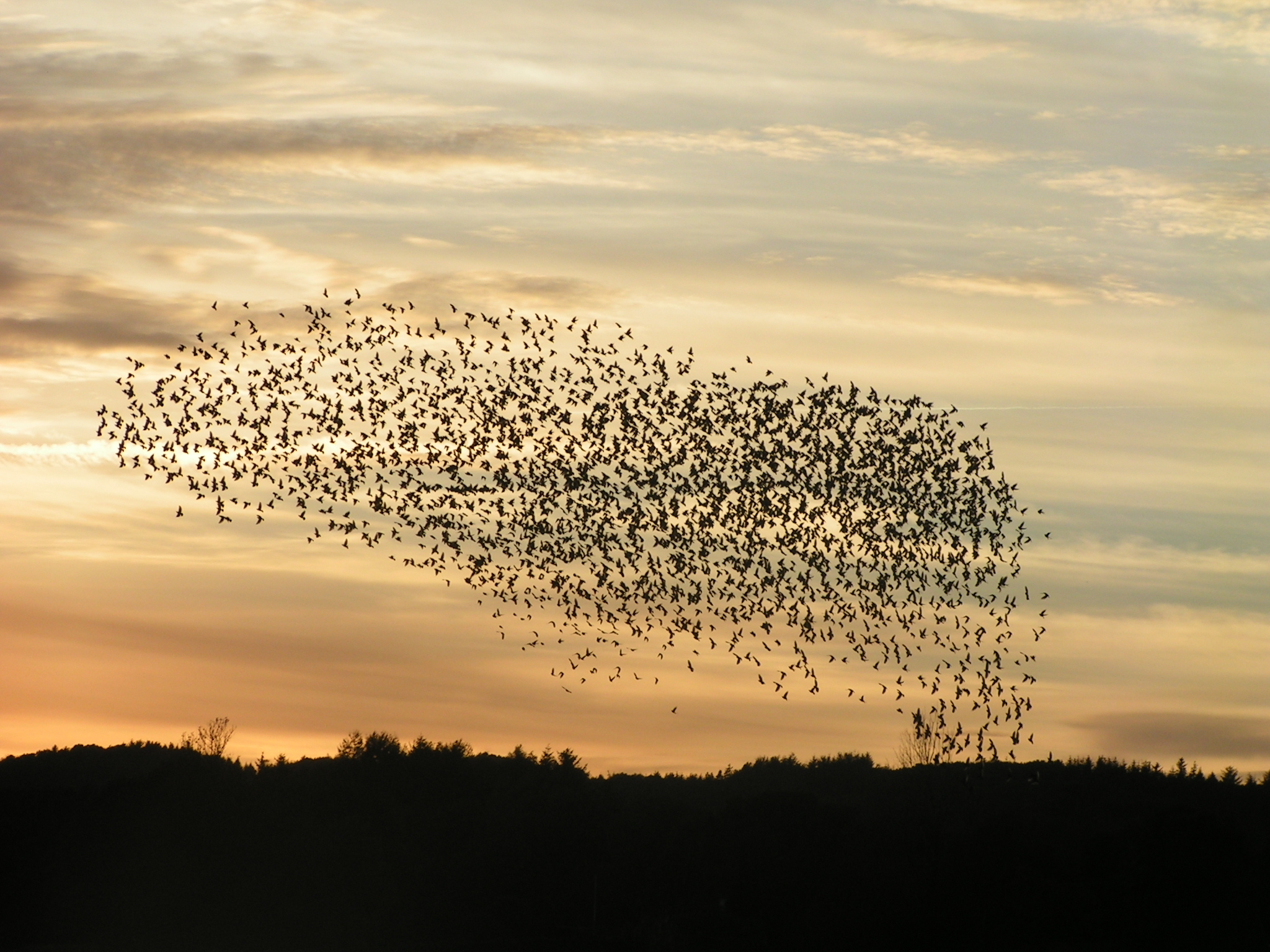
Birds flocking (boids in Blender), an example of self-organization in biology

Self-organization in biology can be observed in spontaneous folding of proteins and other biomacromolecules, self-assembly of lipid bilayer membranes, pattern formation and morphogenesis in developmental biology, the coordination of human movement, eusocial behavior in insects (bees, ants, termites) and mammals, and flocking behavior in birds and fish.

The mathematical biologist Stuart Kauffman and other structuralists have suggested that self-organization may play roles alongside natural selection in three areas of evolutionary biology, namely population dynamics, molecular evolution, and morphogenesis. However, this does not take into account the essential role of energy in driving biochemical reactions in cells. The systems of reactions in any cell are self-catalyzing, but not simply self-organizing, as they are thermodynamically open systems relying on a continuous input of energy. Self-organization is not an alternative to natural selection, but it constrains what evolution can do and provides mechanisms such as the self-assembly of membranes which evolution then exploits.

The evolution of order in living systems and the generation of order in certain non-living systems was proposed to obey a common fundamental principal called "the Darwinian dynamic" that was formulated by first considering how microscopic order is generated in simple non-biological systems that are far from thermodynamic equilibrium. Consideration was then extended to short, replicating RNA molecules assumed to be similar to the earliest forms of life in the RNA world. It was shown that the underlying order-generating processes of self-organization in the non-biological systems and in replicating RNA are basically similar.

=== Cosmology ===
In his 1995 conference paper "Cosmology as a problem in critical phenomena" Lee Smolin said that several cosmological objects or phenomena, such as spiral galaxies, galaxy formation processes in general, early structure formation, quantum gravity and the large scale structure of the universe might be the result of or have involved certain degree of self-organization. He argues that self-organized systems are often critical systems, with structure spreading out in space and time over every available scale, as shown for example by Per Bak and his collaborators. Therefore, because the distribution of matter in the universe is more or less scale invariant over many orders of magnitude, ideas and strategies developed in the study of self-organized systems could be helpful in tackling certain unsolved problems in cosmology and astrophysics.

=== Computer science ===
Phenomena from mathematics and computer science such as cellular automata, random graphs, and some instances of evolutionary computation and artificial life exhibit features of self-organization. In swarm robotics, self-organization is used to produce emergent behavior. In particular the theory of random graphs has been used as a justification for self-organization as a general principle of complex systems. In the field of multi-agent systems, understanding how to engineer systems that are capable of presenting self-organized behavior is an active research area. Optimization algorithms can be considered self-organizing because they aim to find the optimal solution to a problem. If the solution is considered as a state of the iterative system, the optimal solution is the selected, converged structure of the system. Self-organizing networks include small-world networks self-stabilization and scale-free networks. These emerge from bottom-up interactions, unlike top-down hierarchical networks within organizations, which are not self-organizing. Cloud computing systems have been argued to be inherently self-organizing, but while they have some autonomy, they are not self-managing as they do not have the goal of reducing their own complexity.

=== Cybernetics ===
Norbert Wiener regarded the automatic serial identification of a black box and its subsequent reproduction as self-organization in cybernetics. The importance of phase locking or the "attraction of frequencies", as he called it, is discussed in the 2nd edition of his Cybernetics: Or Control and Communication in the Animal and the Machine. K. Eric Drexler sees self-replication as a key step in nano and universal assembly. By contrast, the four concurrently connected galvanometers of W. Ross Ashby's Homeostat hunt, when perturbed, to converge on one of many possible stable states. Ashby used his state counting measure of variety to describe stable states and produced the "Good Regulator" theorem which requires internal models for self-organized endurance and stability (e.g. Nyquist stability criterion). Warren McCulloch proposed "Redundancy of Potential Command" as characteristic of the organization of the brain and human nervous system and the necessary condition for self-organization. Heinz von Foerster proposed Redundancy, R=1 − H/H_{max}, where H is entropy. In essence this states that unused potential communication bandwidth is a measure of self-organization.

In the 1970s Stafford Beer considered self-organization necessary for autonomy in persisting and living systems. He applied his viable system model to management. It consists of five parts: the monitoring of performance of the survival processes (1), their management by recursive application of regulation (2), homeostatic operational control (3) and development (4) which produce maintenance of identity (5) under environmental perturbation. Focus is prioritized by an alerting "algedonic loop" feedback: a sensitivity to both pain and pleasure produced from under-performance or over-performance relative to a standard capability.

In the 1990s Gordon Pask argued that von Foerster's H and Hmax were not independent, but interacted via countably infinite recursive concurrent spin processes which he called concepts. His strict definition of concept "a procedure to bring about a relation" permitted his theorem "Like concepts repel, unlike concepts attract" to state a general spin-based principle of self-organization. His edict, an exclusion principle, "There are No Doppelgangers" means no two concepts can be the same. After sufficient time, all concepts attract and coalesce as pink noise. The theory applies to all organizationally closed or homeostatic processes that produce enduring and coherent products which evolve, learn and adapt.

=== Sociology ===
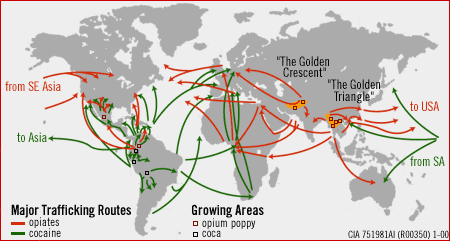
Social self-organization in international drug routes

The self-organizing behavior of social animals and the self-organization of simple mathematical structures both suggest that self-organization should be expected in human society. Tell-tale signs of self-organization are usually statistical properties shared with self-organizing physical systems. Examples such as critical mass, herd behavior, groupthink and others, abound in sociology, economics, behavioral finance and anthropology. Spontaneous order can be influenced by arousal.

In social theory, the concept of self-referentiality has been introduced as a sociological application of self-organization theory by Niklas Luhmann (1984). For Luhmann the elements of a social system are self-producing communications, i.e. a communication produces further communications and hence a social system can reproduce itself as long as there is dynamic communication. For Luhmann, human beings are sensors in the environment of the system. Luhmann developed an evolutionary theory of society and its subsystems, using functional analyses and systems theory.

Anarchism can advocate self-organization as one of its basic principles.

=== Economics ===
The market economy is sometimes said to be self-organizing. Paul Krugman has written on the role that market self-organization plays in the business cycle in his book The Self Organizing Economy. Friedrich Hayek coined the term catallaxy to describe a "self-organizing system of voluntary co-operation", in regards to the spontaneous order of the free market economy. Neo-classical economists hold that imposing central planning usually makes the self-organized economic system less efficient. On the other end of the spectrum, economists consider that market failures are so significant that self-organization produces bad results and that the state should direct production and pricing. Most economists adopt an intermediate position and recommend a mixture of market economy and command economy characteristics (sometimes called a mixed economy). When applied to economics, the concept of self-organization can quickly become ideologically imbued.

=== Learning ===
Enabling others to "learn how to learn" is often taken to mean instructing them how to submit to being taught. Self-organized learning (SOL) denies that "the expert knows best" or that there is ever "the one best method", insisting instead on "the construction of personally significant, relevant and viable meaning" to be tested experientially by the learner. This may be collaborative, and more rewarding personally. It is seen as a lifelong process, not limited to specific learning environments (home, school, university) or under the control of authorities such as parents and professors. It needs to be tested, and intermittently revised, through the personal experience of the learner. It need not be restricted by either consciousness or language. Fritjof Capra argued that it is poorly recognized within psychology and education. It may be related to cybernetics as it involves a negative feedback control loop, or to systems theory. It can be conducted as a learning conversation or dialog between learners or within one person.

=== Transportation ===
The self-organizing behavior of drivers in traffic flow determines almost all the spatiotemporal behavior of traffic, such as traffic breakdown at a highway bottleneck, highway capacity, and the emergence of moving traffic jams. These self-organizing effects are explained by Boris Kerner's three-phase traffic theory.

=== Linguistics ===
Order appears spontaneously in the evolution of language as individual and population behavior interacts with biological evolution.

=== Research ===
Self-organized funding allocation (SOFA) is a method of distributing funding for scientific research. In this system, each researcher is allocated an equal amount of funding, and is required to anonymously allocate a fraction of their funds to the research of others. Proponents of SOFA argue that it would result in similar distribution of funding as the present grant system, but with less overhead. In 2016, a test pilot of SOFA began in the Netherlands.

== Criticism ==
Heinz Pagels, in a 1985 review of Ilya Prigogine and Isabelle Stengers's book Order Out of Chaos in Physics Today, appeals to authority:

Most scientists would agree with the critical view expressed in Problems of Biological Physics (Springer Verlag, 1981) by the biophysicist L. A. Blumenfeld, when he wrote: "The meaningful macroscopic ordering of biological structure does not arise due to the increase of certain parameters of a system above their critical values. These structures are built according to program-like complicated architectural structures, the meaningful information created during many billions of years of chemical and biological evolution being used." Life is a consequence of microscopic, not macroscopic, organization.

Of course, Blumenfeld does not answer the further question of how those program-like structures emerge in the first place. His explanation leads directly to infinite regress.

In short, they [Prigogine and Stengers] maintain that time irreversibility is not derived from a time-independent microworld, but is itself fundamental. The virtue of their idea is that it resolves what they perceive as a "clash of doctrines" about the nature of time in physics. Most physicists would agree that there is neither empirical evidence to support their view, nor is there a mathematical necessity for it. There is no "clash of doctrines." Only Prigogine and a few colleagues hold to these speculations which, in spite of their efforts, continue to live in the twilight zone of scientific credibility.

== See also ==
- Autopoiesis
- Autowave
- Project Cybersyn
- Self-organized criticality control
- Free energy principle
- Information theory
- Constructal law
- Stigmergy
- Swarm intelligence
- Outline of organizational theory
