= Dante R. Chialvo =

American academic

- Born: 1956; Argentina
- Citizenship: Argentina, United States^{[explain status]}
- Education: University of Rosario, Argentina
- Known for: Conjecture considering critical phenomena as the brain dynamical state
- Scientific career
- Fields: Complex systems theory

Dante R. Chialvo (born 1956) is a professor at Universidad Nacional de San Martin. Together with Per Bak, they put forward concrete models considering the brain as a critical system. Initial contributions focussed on mathematical ideas of how learning could benefit from criticality. Further work provided experimental evidence for this conjecture both at large and small scale. He was named Fulbright Scholar in 2005 and elected as a Fellow of the American Physical Society in 2007 and as Member of the Academia de Ciencias de America Latina in 2022. The Academia Nacional de Ciencias Exactas y Naturales granted the Life Achievement Award (Premio Consagración) in Mathematics, Physics & Astronomy in 2024. The School of Science of the Hong Kong Baptist University honored him as Distinguished Professor of Physics in 2024. In 2025 was inducted as Member of the Academia Nacional de Ciencias (Cordoba, Argentina).
