= Tang Chao =

Tang Chao may refer to:

- Tang dynasty, or Tang Chao in Chinese
- Tang Dynasty (band), Chinese band
- Tang Chao (physicist), Chinese physicist
