= Caroline Klivans =

American mathematician

- Education: Cornell University(1999); MIT (PhD, 2003)
- Scientific career
- Fields: Mathematics
- Workplaces: Brown University
- Thesis: Combinatorial Properties of Shifted Complexes (2003)
- Doctoral advisor: Richard Peter Stanley
- Website: www.dam.brown.edu/people/cklivans/

Caroline Jane (Carly) Klivans is an American mathematician specializing in algebraic combinatorics, including work on cell complexes associated with matroids and on chip-firing games. She is a professor of applied mathematics at Brown University, and associate director of the Institute for Computational and Experimental Research in Mathematics at Brown.

== Education and career ==
After graduating from Mt. Lebanon High School, Kilvan attended Cornell University where she was the 1999 winner of the Alice T. Schafer Prize of the Association for Women in Mathematics. Her undergraduate research project involved robot navigation algorithms. She graduated from Cornell in 1999, and completed her Ph.D. at the Massachusetts Institute of Technology in 2003. Her dissertation, Combinatorial Properties of Shifted Complexes, was supervised by Richard P. Stanley.

After postdoctoral research at the Mathematical Sciences Research Institute and the University of Chicago, where she was an L. E. Dickson Instructor, and positions as a researcher and lecturer at the University of Chicago and Brown University, she became associate director of the Institute for Computational and Experimental Research in Mathematics at Brown in 2015, and obtained a regular-rank faculty position as associate professor there in 2018.

== Contributions ==
Klivans is the author of the book The Mathematics of Chip-Firing (CRC Press, 2018).

Her research contributions include a disproof of a 50-year-old conjecture of Richard Stanley that every abstract simplicial complex whose face ring is a Cohen–Macaulay ring can be partitioned into disjoint intervals, each including a facet of the complex. Such a partition generalizes a shelling and (if it always existed) would have been helpful in understanding the h-vectors of these complexes.
