= Critical phenomena =

Physics associated with critical points

In physics, critical phenomena is the collective name associated with the physics of critical points. Most of them stem from the divergence of the correlation length, but also the dynamics slows down. Critical phenomena include scaling relations among different quantities, power-law divergences of some quantities (such as the magnetic susceptibility in the ferromagnetic phase transition) described by critical exponents, universality, fractal behaviour, and ergodicity breaking. Critical phenomena take place in second order phase transitions, although not exclusively.

The critical behavior is usually different from the mean-field approximation which is valid away from the phase transition, since the latter neglects correlations, which become increasingly important as the system approaches the critical point where the correlation length diverges. Many properties of the critical behavior of a system can be derived in the framework of the renormalization group.

In order to explain the physical origin of these phenomena, we shall use the Ising model as a pedagogical example.

== Critical point of the 2D Ising model ==
Consider a $2D$ square array of classical spins which may only take two positions: +1 and −1, at a certain temperature $T$, interacting through the Ising classical Hamiltonian:

$$H= -J \sum_{[i,j]} S_i\cdot S_j$$

where the sum is extended over the pairs of nearest neighbours and $J$ is a coupling constant, which we will consider to be fixed. There is a certain temperature, called the Curie temperature or critical temperature, $T_c$ below which the system presents ferromagnetic long range order. Above it, it is paramagnetic and is apparently disordered.

At temperature zero, the system may only take one global sign, either +1 or -1. At higher temperatures, but below $T_c$, the state is still globally magnetized, but clusters of the opposite sign appear. As the temperature increases, these clusters start to contain smaller clusters themselves, in a typical Russian dolls picture. Their typical size, called the correlation length, $\xi$ grows with temperature until it diverges at $T_c$. This means that the whole system is such a cluster, and there is no global magnetization. Above that temperature, the system is globally disordered, but with ordered clusters within it, whose size is again called correlation length, but it is now decreasing with temperature. At infinite temperature, it is again zero, with the system fully disordered.

== Divergences at the critical point ==
The correlation length diverges at the critical point: as $T\to T_c$, $\xi\to\infty$. This divergence poses no physical problem. Other physical observables diverge at this point, leading to some confusion at the beginning.

The most important is susceptibility. Let us apply a very small magnetic field to the system in the critical point. A very small magnetic field is not able to magnetize a large coherent cluster, but with these fractal clusters the picture changes. It affects easily the smallest size clusters, since they have a nearly paramagnetic behaviour. But this change, in its turn, affects the next-scale clusters, and the perturbation climbs the ladder until the whole system changes radically. Thus, critical systems are very sensitive to small changes in the environment.

Other observables, such as the specific heat, may also diverge at this point. All these divergences stem from that of the correlation length.

== Critical exponents and universality ==
As we approach the critical point, these diverging observables behave as $A(T)\propto (T-T_c)^\alpha$ for some exponent $\alpha\,,$ where, typically, the value of the exponent α is the same above and below T_{c}. These exponents are called critical exponents and are robust observables. Even more, they take the same values for very different physical systems. This intriguing phenomenon, called universality, is explained, qualitatively and also quantitatively, by the renormalization group.

== Critical dynamics ==
Critical phenomena may also appear for dynamic quantities, not only for static ones. In fact, the divergence of the characteristic time $\tau$ of a system is directly related to the divergence of the thermal correlation length $\xi$ by the introduction of a dynamical exponent z and the relation $\tau =\xi^{\,z}$ . The voluminous static universality class of a system splits into different, less voluminous dynamic universality classes with different values of z but a common static critical behaviour, and by approaching the critical point one may observe all kinds of slowing-down phenomena. The divergence of relaxation time $\tau$ at criticality leads to singularities in various collective transport quantities, e.g., the interdiffusivity, shear viscosity $\eta\sim \xi^{x_\eta}$, and bulk viscosity $\zeta \sim \xi^{x_\zeta}$. The dynamic critical exponents follow certain scaling relations, viz., $z=d+x_\eta$, where d is the space dimension. There is only one independent dynamic critical exponent. Values of these exponents are dictated by several universality classes. According to the Hohenberg−Halperin nomenclature, for the model H universality class (fluids) $x_\eta \simeq 0.068, z \simeq 3.068$.

== Ergodicity breaking ==
Ergodicity is the assumption that a system, at a given temperature, explores the full phase space, just each state takes different probabilities. In an Ising ferromagnet below $T_c$ this does not happen. If $T<T_c$, never mind how close they are, the system has chosen a global magnetization, and the phase space is divided into two regions. From one of them it is impossible to reach the other, unless a magnetic field is applied, or temperature is raised above $T_c$.

See also superselection sector

== Mathematical tools ==
The main mathematical tools to study critical points are renormalization group, which takes advantage of the Russian dolls picture or the self-similarity to explain universality and predict numerically the critical exponents, and variational perturbation theory, which converts divergent perturbation expansions into convergent strong-coupling expansions relevant to critical phenomena. In two-dimensional systems, conformal field theory is a powerful tool which has discovered many new properties of 2D critical systems, employing the fact that scale invariance, along with a few other requisites, leads to an infinite symmetry group.

== Critical point in renormalization group theory ==
The critical point is described by a conformal field theory. According to the renormalization group theory, the defining property of criticality is that the characteristic length scale of the structure of the physical system, also known as the correlation length ξ, becomes infinite. This can happen along critical lines in phase space. This effect is the cause of the critical opalescence that can be observed as a binary fluid mixture approaches its liquid–liquid critical point.

In systems in equilibrium, the critical point is reached only by precisely tuning a control parameter. However, in some non-equilibrium systems, the critical point is an attractor of the dynamics in a manner that is robust with respect to system parameters, a phenomenon referred to as self-organized criticality.

== Applications ==
Applications arise in physics and chemistry, but also in fields such as sociology. For example, it is natural to describe a system of two political parties by an Ising model. Thereby, at a transition from one majority to the other, the above-mentioned critical phenomena may appear.

== See also ==
- Catastrophe theory
- Conformal field theory
- Critical brain hypothesis
- Critical exponent
- Critical opalescence
- Critical point
- Ergodicity
- Ising model
- Rushbrooke inequality
- Self-organized criticality
- Variational perturbation theory
- Widom scaling

== Bibliography ==
- Phase Transitions and Critical Phenomena, vol. 1-20 (1972–2001), Academic Press, Ed.: C. Domb, M.S. Green, J.L. Lebowitz
- J.J. Binney et al. (1993): The theory of critical phenomena, Clarendon press.
- N. Goldenfeld (1993): Lectures on phase transitions and the renormalization group, Addison-Wesley.
- H. Kleinert and V. Schulte-Frohlinde, Critical Properties of φ^{4}-Theories, World Scientific (Singapore, 2001); Paperback ISBN 981-02-4659-5 (Read online at )
- J. M. Yeomans, Statistical Mechanics of Phase Transitions (Oxford Science Publications, 1992) ISBN 0-19-851730-0
- M.E. Fisher, Renormalization Group in Theory of Critical Behavior, Reviews of Modern Physics, vol. 46, p. 597-616 (1974)
- H. E. Stanley, Introduction to Phase Transitions and Critical Phenomena
