= Forest-fire model =

Dynamical systems displaying self-organized criticality

Evolution of forest with p/f=100

960 frames of a forest fire simulation within 38.4 seconds (25 frames per second)

In applied mathematics, a forest-fire model is any of a number of dynamical systems displaying self-organized criticality. They were invented in order to explore and understand the mathematical foundations of self-organized criticality, rather than to be accurate models of forest fires.

According to Pruessner et al. (2002, 2004) the forest-fire model does not behave critically on very large, i.e. physically relevant scales. Early versions go back to Henley (1989) and Drossel and Schwabl (1992). The model is defined as a cellular automaton on a grid with L^{d} cells. L is the sidelength of the grid and d is its dimension. A cell can be empty, occupied by a tree, or burning. The model of Drossel and Schwabl (1992) is defined by four rules which are executed simultaneously:

1. A burning cell turns into an empty cell
2. A tree will burn if at least one neighbor is burning
3. A tree ignites with probability f even if no neighbor is burning
4. An empty space fills with a tree with probability p

The controlling parameter of the model is p/f which gives the average number of trees planted between two lightning strikes (see Schenk et al. (1996) and Grassberger (1993)). In order to exhibit a fractal frequency-size distribution of clusters a double separation of time scales is necessary

$$f \ll p \ll T_\mathrm{smax}^{-1}\,$$

where T_{smax} is the burn time of the largest cluster. The scaling behavior is not simple, however (Grassberger 1993, 2002 and Pruessner et al. 2002, 2004).

A cluster is defined as a coherent set of cells, all of which have the same state. Cells are coherent if they can reach each other via nearest neighbor relations. In most cases, the von Neumann neighborhood (four adjacent cells) is considered.

The first condition $f\ll p$ allows large structures to develop, while the second condition $p\ll T_\mathrm{smax}^{-1}$ keeps trees from popping up alongside a cluster while burning.

In landscape ecology, the forest fire model is used to illustrate the role of the fuel mosaic in the wildfire regime. The importance of the fuel mosaic on wildfire spread is debated. Parsimonious models such as the forest fire model can help to explore the role of the fuel mosaic and its limitations in explaining observed patterns.

== See also ==
- Percolation theory
