= Variational perturbation theory =

In mathematics, variational perturbation theory (VPT) is a mathematical method to convert divergent power series in a small expansion parameter, say

$$s=\sum_{n=0}^\infty a_n g^n$$,

into a convergent series in powers

$$s=\sum_{n=0}^\infty b_n /(g^\omega)^n$$,

where $\omega$ is a critical exponent (the so-called index of "approach to scaling" introduced by Franz Wegner). This is possible with the help of variational parameters, which are determined by optimization order by order in $g$. The partial sums are converted to convergent partial sums by a method developed in 1992.

Most perturbation expansions in quantum mechanics are divergent for any small coupling strength $g$. They can be made convergent by VPT (for details see the first textbook cited below). The convergence is exponentially fast.

After its success in quantum mechanics, VPT has been developed further to become an important mathematical tool in quantum field theory with its anomalous dimensions. Applications focus on the theory of critical phenomena. It has led to the most accurate predictions of critical exponents. More details can be read here.
