= Bak–Sneppen model =

Model of co-evolution between interacting species

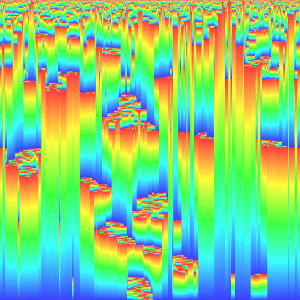
Sample of Bak–Sneppen model evolution: on the x-axis the population status, on the y-axis (from top to the bottom) the history of the population. Each discontinuity represents an evolution. The color codes the age of the species.

The Bak–Sneppen model is a simple model of co-evolution between interacting species. It was developed to show how self-organized criticality may explain key features of the fossil record, such as the distribution of sizes of extinction events and the phenomenon of punctuated equilibrium. It is a minimalistic model, designed not so much to be an accurate model of evolutionary biology, as it is to show that bursty avalanche phenomena and intermittency seen in condensed matter physics can be applied in much broader settings, such as evolutionary biology. It is named after Per Bak and Kim Sneppen.

The model dynamics repeatedly eliminates the least adapted species and mutates it and its neighbors to recreate the interaction between species. A comprehensive study of the details of this model can be found in Phys. Rev. E 53, 414–443 (1996). A solvable version of the model has been proposed in Phys. Rev. Lett. 76, 348–351 (1996), which shows that the dynamics evolves sub-diffusively, driven by a long-range memory.

An evolutionary local search heuristic based on the Bak–Sneppen model, called extremal optimization, has been introduced in Boettcher, Stefan; Percus, Allon (2000). "Nature's way of optimizing". Artificial Intelligence. 119 (1–2): 275–286. arXiv:cond-mat/9901351. doi:10.1016/S0004-3702(00)00007-2. S2CID 7128022. The Bak–Sneppen model has been applied to the theory of scientific progress.

== Description ==
We consider N species, which are associated with a fitness factor f(i). They are indexed by integers i around a ring. The algorithm consists in choosing the least fit species, and then replacing it and its two closest neighbors (previous and next integer) by new species, with a new random fitness. After a long run there will be a minimum required fitness, below which species don't survive. These "long-run" events are referred to as avalanches, and the model proceeds through these avalanches until it reaches a state of relative stability where all species' fitness are above a certain threshold.

== See also ==
- Evolutionary biology
