= Phase Transitions and Critical Phenomena =

20-volume series of books on physics

- Discipline: Physics
- Language: English
- Edited by: Cyril Domb and Melville S. Green (vols. 1-6); Cyril Domb and Joel Lebowitz (vols. 6-20)

Publication details
- Publisher: Academic Press

Standard abbreviations
- ISO 4: Ph. Transit. Crit. Phenom.

Indexing
- ISSN: 1062-7901

Phase Transitions and Critical Phenomena is a 20-volume series of books, comprising review articles on phase transitions and critical phenomena, published during 1972-2001. It is "considered the most authoritative series on the topic".

Volumes 1-6 were edited by Cyril Domb and Melville S. Green, and after Green's death, volumes 7-20 were edited by Domb and Joel Lebowitz.

Volume 4 was never published. Volume 5 was published in two volumes, as 5A and 5B.

The first volume was praised for its coherent approach. While praised for its sound theoretical approach, the first volume remained at considerable distance from being able to explain experimental results in things like structural phase transitions.

The second volume was praised for being well written, and was suggested as a standard reference. The third volume was also suggested as an index for researchers.

== Contents ==
- Volume 1: Exact Results (1972) ISBN 0122203011
  - 'Introductory Note on Phase Transitions and Critical Phenomena', by C.N. Yang.
  - 'Rigorous Results and Theorems', by R.B. Griffiths.
  - 'Dilute Quantum Systems', by J. Ginibre.
  - 'The C*-Algebraic Approach to Phase Transitions', by G.G. Emch.
  - 'One-dimensional Models — Short Range Forces', by C.J. Thompson
  - 'Two-dimensional Ising Models', by H.N.V. Temperley.
  - 'Transformation of Ising Models', by I. Syozi.
  - 'Two-dimensional Ferroelectric Models', by E.H. Lieb and Fa Yueh Wu.
- Volume 2: (1972) ISBN 012220302X
  - 'Thermodynamics' M.J. Buckingham.
  - 'Equilibrium Scaling in Fluids and Magnets', by M. Vicentini-Missoni.
  - 'Surface Tension of Fluids', by B. Widom.
  - 'Surface and Size Effects in Lattice Models', by P.G. Watson.
  - 'Exact Calculations on a Random Ising Systems', by B. McCoy.
  - 'Percolation and Cluster Size', by J.W. Essam.
  - 'Melting and Statistical Geometry of Simple Liquids', by R. Collins.
  - 'Lattice Gas Theories of Melting', by L.K. Runnels.
  - 'Closed Form Approximations for Lattice Systems', by D.M. Burley.
  - 'Critical Properties of the Spherical Model', by G.S. Joyce.
  - 'Kinetics of Ising Models', by K. Kawasaki.
- Volume 3: Series Expansions for Lattice Models (1974) ISBN 0122203038
  - 'Graph Theory and Embeddings', by C. Domb.
  - 'Computer Techniques for Evaluating Lattice Constants', by J.L. Martin.
  - 'Linked Cluster Expansion' M. Wortis.
  - 'Asymptotic Analysis of Coefficients', by A.J. Guttmann and D.S. Gaunt.
  - 'Heisenberg Model', by G.S. Rushbrooke, G.A. Baker Jr and P.J. Wood.
  - 'Ising Model', by C. Domb.
  - 'Classical Vector Models', by H. Eugene Stanley.
  - 'D-vector Model or "Universality Hamiltonian": Properties of Isotropically-Interacting D-Dimensional Classical Spins', by H. Eugene Stanley.
  - 'X-Y Model', by D.B. Betts.
  - 'Ferroelectric Models', by J.F. Nagle.
- Volume 4: (Never published)
- Volume 5a (1976) ISBN 0122203054
  - 'Scaling, Universality and Operator Algebras', by L.P. Kadanoff.
  - 'Generalized Landau Theories', by M. Luban.
  - 'Neutron Scattering and Spatial Correlation near the Critical Point', by J. Als-Nielsen.
  - 'Mode Coupling and Critical Dynamics', by K. Kawasaki.
- Volume 5b (1976) ISBN 0122203054
  - 'Monte Carlo Investigations of Phase Transitions and Critical Phenomena', by K. Binder.
  - 'System with Weak Long-Range Potentials', by P.C. Hemmer and J.L. Lebowitz.
  - 'Correlation Functions and their Generating Functionals: General Relations with Applications to the Theory of Fluids', by G. Stell.
  - 'Heisenberg Ferromagnet in the Green's Function Approximation', by R.A. Tahir-Kheli.
  - 'Thermal Measurements and Critical Phenomena in Liquids', by A.V. Voronel.
- Volume 6: (1976) ISBN 0122203062
  - 'The Renormalization Group — Introduction', by Kenneth G. Wilson.
  - 'The Critical State, General Aspects', by F.J. Wegner.
  - 'Field Theoretical Approach to Critical Phenomena' E. Brezin, J.C. Le Guillou and J. Zinn-Justin.
  - 'The 1/n Expansion', by Shang-Keng Ma.
  - 'The ε-Expansion for Exponents and the Equation of State in Isotropic Systems', by D.J. Wallace.
  - 'Dependence of Universal Critical Behaviour on Symmetry and Range of Interaction', by A. Aharony.
  - 'Renormalization: Theory Ising-like Spin Systems', by Th. Niemeijer and J.M.J. van Leeuwen.
  - 'Renormalization Group Approach to Critical Phenomena', by C. Di Castro and G. Jona-Lasinio.
- Volume 7: (1983) ISBN 0122203070
  - 'Defect-Mediated Phase Transitions', by D.R. Nelson.
  - 'Conformational Phase Transitions in a Macromolecule: Exactly Solvable Models', by F.W. Wiegel.
  - 'Dilute Magnetism', by R.B. Stinchcombe.
- Volume 8: (1983) ISBN 0122203089
  - 'Critical Behaviour at Surfaces', by K. Binder.
  - 'Finite-Size Scaling', by M.N. Barber.
  - 'The Dynamics of First Order Phase Transitions', by J.D. Gunton, M. San Miguel and P.S. Sahni.
- Volume 9: (1984) ISBN 0122203097
  - 'Theory of Tricritical Points', by I.D. Lawrie and S. Sarbach.
  - 'Multicritical Points in Fluid Mixtures: Experimental Studies', by C.M. Knobler and R.L. Scott.
  - 'Critical Point Statistical Mechanics and Quantum Field Theory', by G.A. Baker, Jr.
- Volume 10: (1986) ISBN 0122203100
  - 'Surface Structures and Phase Transitions — Exact Results', by D.B. Abraham.
  - 'Field-theoretic Approach to Critical Behaviour at Surfaces', by H.W. Diehl.
  - 'Renormalization Group Theory of Interfaces', by D. Jasnow.
- Volume 11: (1987) ISBN 0122203119
  - 'Coulomb Gas Formulation of Two-Dimensional Phase Transitions', by B. Nienhus.
  - 'Conformal Invariance', by J.L. Cardy.
  - 'Low-Temperature Properties of Classical Lattice Systems: Phase Transitions and Phase Diagrams', by J. Slawny.
- Volume 12: (1988) ISBN 0122203127
  - 'Wetting Phenomena', by S. Dietrich.
  - 'The Domain Wall Theory of Two-Dimensional Commensurate-Incommensurate Phase Transition', by M. P. M. den Nijs.
  - 'The Growth of Fractal Aggregates and their Fractal Measures', by P. Meakin.
- Volume 13: (1989) ISBN 0122203135
  - 'Asymptotic Analysis of Power-Series Expansions', by A.J. Guttmann.
  - 'Dimer Models on Anisotropic Lattices', by S.M. Bhattachargee, S.O. Carlos, J.F. Nagle and C.S.O Yokoi.
- Volume 14: (1991) ISBN 0122203143
  - 'Universal Critical-Point Amplitude Relations' V. Privman, P.C. Hohenberg, and A. Aharony.
  - 'The Behavior of Interfaces in Ordered and Disordered Systems', by R. Lipowsky, G. Forgacs and Th.M. Nieuwenhuizen.
- Volume 15: (1992) ISBN 0122203151
  - 'Spatially Modulated Structures in Systems with Competing Interactions', by W. Selke.
  - 'The Large-n Limit in Statistical Mechanics and the Spectral Theory of Disordered Systems', by A.M. Khorunzhy, B.A. Khorzhenko, L.A. Pastur and M.V. Shcherbina.
- Volume 16: (1994) ISBN 012220316X
  - 'Self-assembling Amphiphilic Systems', by G. Gompper and M. Schick.
- Volume 17: (1995) ISBN 0122203178
  - 'Statistical Mechanics of Driven Diffusive Systems', by B. Schmittmann and R.K.P. Zia.
- Volume 18: (2001) ISBN 0122203186
  - 'The Random Geometry of Equilibrium Phases', by O. Häggström, H.O. Georgii, and C. Maes.
  - 'Exact Combinatorial Algorithms: Ground States of Disordered Systems', by M.J. Alava, P.M. Duxbury, C.F. Moukarzel and H. Rieger.
- Volume 19: (2001) ISBN 0122203194
  - 'Exactly Solvable Models for Many-Body Systems Far from Equilibrium', by G.M. Schütz.
  - 'Polymerized Membranes, a Review', by K.J. Wiese.
- Volume 20: (2001) ISBN 0122203208
  - Cumulative author, title and subject index including table of contents.
