= Michael Schick (physicist) =

American physicist and academic

- Born: Philadelphia, Pennsylvania
- Occupations: Physicist and academic

Academic background
- Education: B.A., Physics; B.S., Chemical Engineering; PHD, Physics
- Alma mater: Tufts University; Stanford University

Academic work
- Institutions: University of Washington

Michael Schick is a physicist and an academic. He is a professor emeritus at the University of Washington.

Schick is best known for his works on biological physics and condensed matter theory. Among his works are publications in academic journals, including Physical Review Letters and Biophysical Journal, as well as the multi-volume book series Soft Matter.

== Early life and education ==
Schick was born in Philadelphia, Pennsylvania, the second son of David and Bessie Schick.

Schick obtained his BA in Physics and a BS in Chemical Engineering from Tufts University. He pursued graduate studies at Stanford University, earning his PhD in Physics under the supervision of Felix Bloch in 1967.

== Career ==
Following the completion of his post-doctoral fellowship in 1969 under Paul Zilsel at Case Western Reserve University, Schick joined the University of Washington. He is a professor emeritus at the university. He was honored five times with the Award for Faculty Excellence in Undergraduate Teaching.

== Research ==
Schick, together with C.E. Campbell, conducted a detailed analysis of the phase transition in the system of helium atoms adsorbed on a graphite substrate. It provided insights into the conditions for the transition, one known to exhibit the same singularities in its free energy as that of the two-dimensional three-state Potts model. In related work, he and his colleagues enlarged the system of the q-state Potts model, in which there is a Potts spin on every lattice site that can point in q directions, to a Potts lattice gas, in which there are Potts spins only on a fraction of the lattice sites. In doing so, they were able to employ a simple real-space renormalization-group transformation that illuminated the reasons for the model's unusual behavior in two dimensions. For all q less than or equal to four, the Potts model exhibits an ordering transition at which the entropy is continuous as the transition is approached from higher or lower temperatures. There are no coexisting phases at the transition. In contrast, for all q greater than four, the transition exhibits an entropy that is discontinuous at the transition, i.e. obtains a different value when the transition temperature is approached from below or above. There is a coexistence of ordered and disordered phases at the transition. The work also suggested values for tricritical exponents of the Potts lattice gas. In 1978, he collaborated with H.J. Hilhorst and J.M.J. van Leeuwen to introduce a differential real-space renormalization-group transformation, i.e. the lattice spacings of the two systems that were related by the transformation differed only infinitesimally from one another. They applied it to the two-dimensional Ising model on a triangular lattice and obtained an exact solution for the system's free energy, one of only a few exact solutions of this model. In 1982 he collaborated with R. Pandit and M. Wortis to study the phenomena of adsorption of a gas on an attractive substrate as a gas to liquid transition is approached in the bulk system. There are essentially two possibilities. In one, drops of liquid form on the surface and create a continuous film whose thickness increases without limit as the gas to liquid transition is approached. In this case, the liquid is said to wet the substrate. In the other, drops of liquid on the surface do not spread. The bulk liquid, when it appears, must be nucleated elsewhere than at the surface and is said not to wet the surface.

M.W. Matsen and Schick elucidated the behaviour of systems of linear polymers consisting of alternating blocks of two different molecules that repel one another. However, the blocks cannot separate macroscopically as they are chemically joined. To reduce their unfavourable contacts, the system orders into various phases. The phases depend on the relative amounts of the two components. A full-phase diagram of this system, which includes an unusual gyroid phase, was determined. The resulting paper is the most cited of Schick's works.

Schick's latest research involves the behaviour of biological membranes. This is a subject he had considered previously in the study of the fusion of such membranes. The more recent work concerns how it could come about that the lipid molecules that make up the plasma membrane, rather than being distributed randomly, could form two distinct regions. They are of a characteristic size, about 100nm, and a characteristic composition. One kind of region is rich in saturated sphingomyelin and cholesterol, while the other is rich in unsaturated lipids. Eschewing the commonly accepted explanation of some form of phase separation, he argued that the system's free energy is reduced if lipids with a given intrinsic curvature go to regions of the membrane that exhibit that curvature. This leads to an emulsion of two regions. The characteristic size is directly related to the surface tension and bending modulus of the membrane itself.

== Awards and honors ==
- 1984 – Fellow, American Physical Society
- 1992-1993 – Humboldt Research Award
- 2011 – Fellow, American Association for the Advancement of Science

== Bibliography ==
=== Books ===
As author (with G. Gompper):

- Self-Assembling Amphiphilic Systems (1994) Academic Press (Volume 16 of Phase Transitions and Critical Phenomena) ISBN 012220316X

As editor (with G. Gompper):

- Soft Matter (2006-2008) Wiley-VCH
  - Volume 1: Polymer Melts and Mixtures ISBN 3527305009
  - Volume 2: Complex Colloidal Suspensions ISBN 3527313699
  - Volume 3: Colloidal Order - Entropic and Surface Forces ISBN 3527313702
  - Volume 4: Lipid Bilayers and Red Blood Cells ISBN 3527315020

=== Selected articles ===
- Campbell, C.E.& Schick, M. (1972). Triangular Lattice Gas. Physical Review A, 5, 1919.
- Schick, M., Walker, J. S., & Wortis, M. (1977) Phase diagram of the triangular Ising model: Renormalization-group calculation with application to adsorbed monolayers. Physical Review B, 16, 2205.
- Hilhorst, H. J., Schick, M., & van Leeuwen, J. M. J. (1978). Differential Form of Real-Space Renormalization: Exact Results for Two-Dimensional Ising Models. Physical Review Letters, 40(25), 1605.
- Nienhuis, B., Berker, A. N., Riedel, E. K., & Schick, M. (1979). First-and second-order phase transitions in Potts models: renormalization-group solution. Physical Review Letters, 43(11), 737.
- Pandit, R., Schick, M., & Wortis, M. (1982). Systematics of multilayer adsorption phenomena on attractive substrates. Physical Review B, 26(9), 5112.
- Schick, M. "An Introduction to Wetting Phenomena", in "Liquids at Interfaces, Proceedings of the Les Houches 1988 Session XLVIII ", J. Charvolin, J.-F. Joanny and J. Zinn-Justin eds., North Holland. p. 416
- Matsen, M. W., & Schick, M. (1994). Stable and unstable phases of a diblock copolymer melt. Physical Review Letters, 72(16), 2660.
- Müller, M., Katsov, K., & Schick, M. (2006). Biological and synthetic membranes: What can be learned from a coarse-grained description?. Physics Reports, 434(5–6), 113–176.
- Schick, M. (2012). Membrane heterogeneity: Manifestation of a curvature induced microemulsion. Physical Review E 85, 031902.
