= Beate Schmittmann =

German-American condensed matter physicist

Beate Schmittmann is a German-American condensed matter physicist and academic administrator who is dean of the College of Liberal Arts and Sciences at Iowa State University. Her research includes work on driven diffusive systems, biomolecular transport, and epidemiology.

== Education and career ==
Schmittmann earned a diploma in physics in 1981 from RWTH Aachen University, and completed a Ph.D. in 1984 at the University of Edinburgh. Her dissertation was jointly supervised by David Wallace and A. D. Bruce.

After working as a researcher and then assistant professor at Heinrich Heine University Düsseldorf, she moved to the US in 1991 to become an associate professor of physics at Virginia Tech. She was promoted to full professor in 1997, and served as department chair from 2006 until 2012, when she moved to Iowa State as dean of Liberal Arts and Sciences. In 2017, Schmittmann was reappointed to the LAS deanship. While working in the United States, Schmittmann acquired American citizenship. In 2019, she was considered a finalist for the provost position at the University of Georgia. Instead, Schmittmann returned to Iowa State, and, in 2022, accepted reappointment to a third five-year term as LAS dean. In March 2023, Schmittmann announced her retirement, effective June 2024. In November 2023, Benjamin Withers was named Schmittmann's successor as dean. During her tenure as dean, Schmittmann was credited with increasing scholarship funds for undergraduate students, and the creation of a student advisory body.

== Book ==
Schmittmann is the coauthor with Royce King-Ping Zia of the book Statistical Mechanics of Driven Diffusive Systems (Phase Transitions and Critical Phenomena, vol. 17, Academic Press, 1995).

== Recognition ==
Schmittmann was named a Fellow of the American Physical Society (APS) in 2004, after a nomination from the APS Topical Group on Statistical & Nonlinear Physics, for "seminal and sustained research on fundamental and applied problems in non-equilibrium statistical physics, in particular driven diffusive systems". In 2010, the Southeastern Section of the APS gave her their Jesse W. Beams Award for research excellence. Schmittmann was the first woman to receive the Beams Award.

She became a Fellow of the American Association for the Advancement of Science in 2015 for "seminal and sustained research on fundamental and applied problems in nonequilibrium statistical physics, and for contributions to administration and to increasing diversity in STEM".
