= Melville S. Green =

American physicist

Melville Saul Green (9 June 1922 – 27 March 1979) was an American statistical physicist. He is known for the Green–Kubo relations.

He was born in Jamaica, New York, and studied at Columbia University, where he was awarded M.A. in 1947, and Princeton University where he was awarded a Ph.D. in 1952. He became a faculty member at the University of Chicago from 1947 to 1951 and a research associate at the Institute of Fluid Dynamics and Applied Mathematics of the University of Maryland from 1951 to 1954. He was appointed head of the statistical physics section of the then National Bureau of Standards from 1954 to 1968. He worked on the Bogoliubov–Born–Green–Kirkwood–Yvon hierarchy, which however is not named for him, but for Herbert S. Green.

Green is also known as a co-editor of an influential review series Phase Transitions and Critical Phenomena.

He married Vivian Grossman in 1950 and had two children.
