= Kurt Wiesenfeld =

American physicist

Kurt Wiesenfeld is an American physicist working primarily on non-linear dynamics. His works primarily concern stochastic resonance, spontaneous synchronization of coupled oscillators, and non-linear laser dynamics. Since 1987, he has been professor of physics at the Georgia Institute of Technology.

== Life and work ==
Kurt Wiesenfeld received his Bachelor of Science in Physics from the Massachusetts Institute of Technology in 1979, after which he moved to University of California, Berkeley and received his doctorate in 1985. From 1984 to 1985, he was a Lecturer and Research Scientist at the University of California, Santa Cruz.

In 1987, as a post-doctoral research scientist in the Solid State Theory Group of Brookhaven National Laboratory, he and another fellow post-doctoral scientist, Chao Tang, along with their mentor, Per Bak, presented new ideas in group organization with a concept they coined self-organized criticality in their paper in Physical Review Letters. The first discovered example of a dynamical system displaying such self-organized criticality was named after them as the Bak–Tang–Wiesenfeld "sandpile" model.

Wiesenfeld looked at Josephson arrays with Steven Strogatz, who admired his calligraphy.

Wiesenfeld is currently a fellow of the American Physical Society, a member of the Society for Industrial and Applied Mathematics (SIAM), and a past member of the Executive Committee of the American Physical Society's Division of Biological Physics.

== Selected publications ==
- K. Wiesenfeld, A. R. Bulsara, and M. E. Inchiosa (2000). "Oscillatory Dynamics of a Nonlinear Amplifier in the High-Gain Regime: Exploiting a Global Connection". Phys. Rev. B. 62 (14): R9232-35. Bibcode:2000PhRvB..62.9232W. doi:10.1103/PhysRevB.62.R9232.
- K. Wiesenfeld and F. Moss (1995). "Stochastic resonance and the benefits of noise: from ice ages to crayfish and SQUIDs". Nature. 373 (6509): 33–36. Bibcode:1995Natur.373...33W. doi:10.1038/373033a0. PMID 7800036. S2CID 4287929.
- K. Wiesenfeld, P. Colet and S. Strogatz (1998). "Frequency locking in n Josephson arrays: connection with the Kuramoto model" (PDF). Phys. Rev. E. 57 (2): 1563–1569. Bibcode:1998PhRvE..57.1563W. doi:10.1103/PhysRevE.57.1563. hdl:10261/53710.
