= Grid complex =

Latticial metal complex or grid complex is a supramolecular complex of several metal atoms and coordinating ligands which form a grid-like structural motif. The structure formation usually occurs while on thermodynamic molecular self-assembly. They have properties that make them interesting for information technology as the future storage materials. Chelate ligands are used as ligands in tetrahedral or octahedral structures, which mostly use nitrogen atoms in pyridine like ring systems other than donor centers. Suitable metal ions are in accordance with octahedral coordinating transition metal ions such as Mn or rare tetrahedral Coordinating such as Ag used.

== Nomenclature ==
The nomenclature is based on [n × m] G, n corresponds to the number of ligands above the metal ion level, m the number below ones. In case of using only one ligand type, the homoleptic grid is formed in a square [nxn] structure. When using different ligands arise heteroleptic complexes, however, compete with the homoleptic. The number of metal ions is always n + m.

== Application ==
The grid complexes exhibit pH-dependent changes in the optical absorption, electronic spin states and reversible redox states. The latticial metal complexes may thus be used theoretically for information storage and processing in the future.

== Other uses ==
An interwoven grid complex has been used to template the synthesis of a doubly-twisted [2]catenane (otherwise known as a Solomon Link). The unique arrangement of interwoven ligands around the planar array of iron, zinc, or cobalt ions generated the crossing points required to covalently trap the interlocked structure using ring-closing metathesis. Building on this discovery, 2 × 2 interwoven grids were used to template the synthesis of more topologically complex molecules: a six-crossing doubly-interlocked [2]catenane and a granny knot. In 2021, the first report of a 3 × 3 interwoven grid was published. It was used to template the synthesis of a molecular Endless Knot.
