= Joel Lebowitz =

Czechoslovak–US mathematical physicist

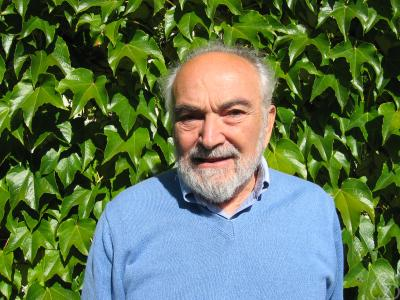
- Lebowitz at Oberwolfach, 2004
- Born: May 10, 1930 (age 96); Tiachiv, Czechoslovakia (now Ukraine)
- Citizenship: American
- Education: Brooklyn College; Syracuse University
- Awards: Boltzmann Medal (1992); Henri Poincaré Prize (2000); Nicholson Medal (2004); Max Planck Medal (2007); Grande Médaille (2014); Dannie Heineman Prize for Mathematical Physics (2021); Dirac Medal (ICTP) (2022)
- Scientific career
- Fields: Statistical Physics; Statistical mechanics
- Workplaces: Rutgers University; Yeshiva University; Stevens Institute of Technology; Yale University
- Thesis: Statistical Mechanics of Nonequilibrium Processes. (1956)
- Doctoral advisor: Peter G. Bergmann
- Other academic advisors: Lars Onsager
- Doctoral students: Michael Aizenman; Sheldon Goldstein; Christian Maes
- Other notable students: de:Detlef Dürr
- Website: cmsr.rutgers.edu/people-cmsr/joel-lebowitz

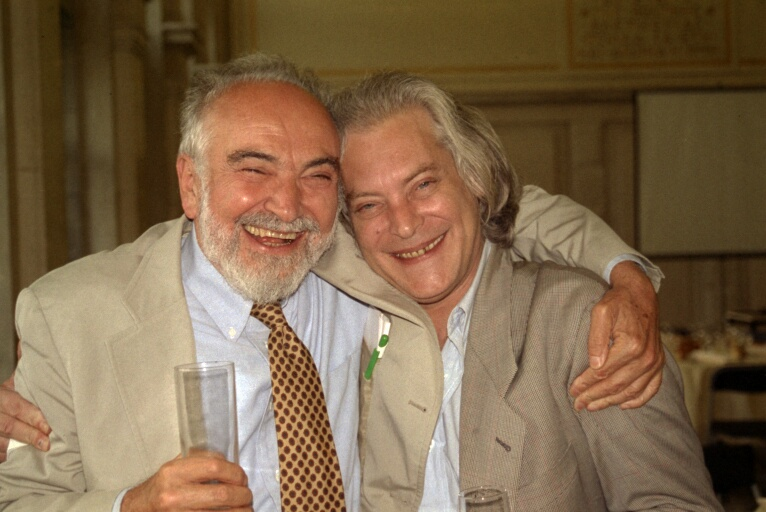
Lebowitz (left) and Mitchell Feigenbaum (right) (1998)

Joel Louis Lebowitz (born May 10, 1930) is a mathematical physicist known for his contributions to statistical physics, statistical mechanics, and many other fields of mathematics and physics. He is a founding editor of the Journal of Statistical Physics and has served as president of the New York Academy of Sciences. Lebowitz is the George William Hill Professor of Mathematics and Physics at Rutgers University. He is also an active member of the human rights community and a co-chair of the Committee of Concerned Scientists.

== Biography ==
Lebowitz was born in 1930 to a Jewish family in Taceva, Czechoslovakia (now Ukraine). During World War II he was deported with his family to Auschwitz, where his father, his mother, and his younger sister were murdered in 1944, victims of the Holocaust.

After being liberated from the camp, he emigrated to the United States by boat, where he studied at an Orthodox Jewish school and Brooklyn College. He earned his PhD at Syracuse University in 1956 under the supervision of Peter G. Bergmann.

He then continued his research with Lars Onsager, at Yale University, where he attained a faculty position. He moved to the Stevens Institute of Technology in Hoboken, New Jersey in 1957 and to the Belfer Graduate School of Science at Yeshiva University in New York City in 1959. Finally, he received a faculty position at Rutgers University in 1977, where he holds the George William Hill Professor position.

During his time at the Yeshiva University and Rutgers University, he has been in contact with several scientists, and artists, like Fumio Yoshimura and Kate Millett. In 1975 he founded the Journal of Statistical Physics. In 1979 he was president of the New York Academy of Sciences. He has been one of the most active supporters of dissident scientists in the former Soviet Union, especially refusenik scientists.

== Scientific legacy ==
Along with Elliott Lieb, Lebowitz proved that the Coulomb interactions obey the thermodynamic limit. He also established what are now known as Lebowitz inequalities for the ferromagnetic Ising model. His current research interests lie in non-equilibrium statistical mechanics.

He became editor-in-chief of the Journal of Statistical Physics in 1975, and held the position until September 2018. Lebowitz hosts a biannual series of conferences, first at Yeshiva University and later at Rutgers University, which has been running for 60 years. He is also known as a co-editor of an influential review series, Phase Transitions and Critical Phenomena.

== Awards and honors ==
Lebowitz has been awarded: the Boltzmann Medal (1992); the Nicholson Medal (2004) awarded by the American Physical Society; the Delmer S. Fahrney Medal (1995); the Henri Poincaré Prize (2000); the Volterra Award (2001); and the Heineman Prize for Mathematical Physics (2021) "for seminal contributions to nonequilibrium and equilibrium statistical mechanics, in particular, studies of large deviations in nonequilibrium steady states and rigorous analysis of Gibbs equilibrium ensembles."

Lebowitz was awarded the Max Planck Medal in 2007, "for his important contributions to the statistical physics of equilibrium and non-equilibrium systems, in particular his contributions to the theory of phase transitions, the dynamics of infinite systems, and the stationary non-equilibrium states" and "for his promoting of new directions of this field at its farthest front, and for enthusiastically introducing several generations of scientists to the field." In 2014 he received the Grande Médaille of the French Academy of Sciences. In 2022, he was awarded the Dirac Medal of the ICTP.

Lebowitz is a member of the United States National Academy of Sciences. In 1966, he became a fellow of the American Physical Society and in 2012, he became a fellow of the American Mathematical Society.

He received an honorary DS degree at Syracuse University's 158th Commencement in 2012.
