= Tang Chao (physicist) =

Chinese physicist

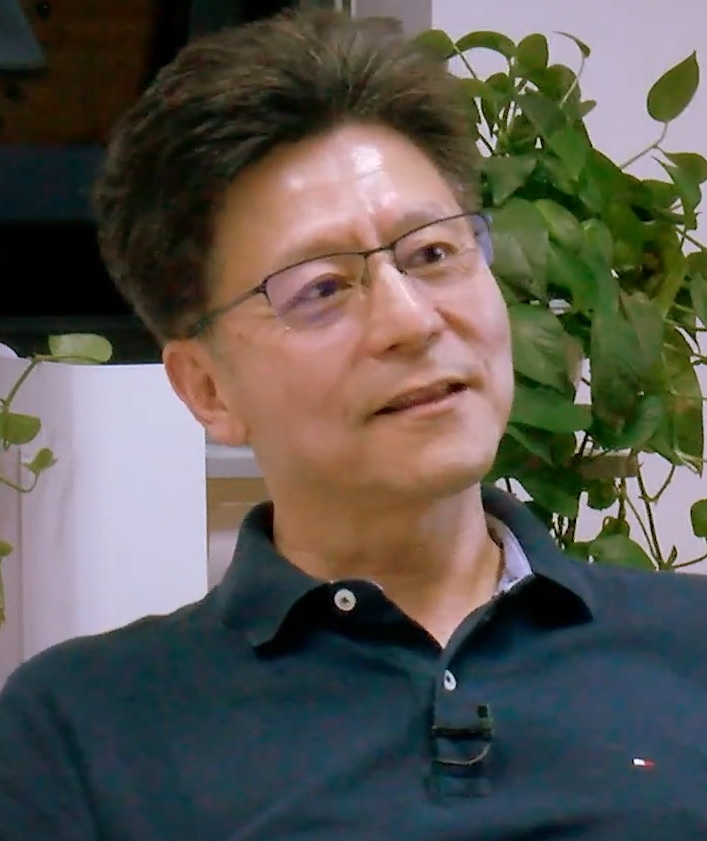
- Born: 1958 (age 67–68); Nanchang, Jiangxi, China
- Education: University of Science and Technology of China; University of Chicago (PhD)
- Known for: Self-organized criticality Bak–Tang–Wiesenfeld sandpile
- Scientific career
- Fields: Physics, Biology
- Workplaces: Peking University
- Doctoral advisor: Leo Kadanoff

Chinese name
- Traditional Chinese: 湯超
- Simplified Chinese: 汤超
Transcriptions
Standard Mandarin
- Hanyu Pinyin: Tāng Chāo

Tang Chao (Chinese: 汤超; born 1958) is a Chair Professor of Physics and Systems Biology at Peking University.

== Education ==
He had his undergraduate training at the University of Science and Technology of China, then went to the United States through the CUSPEA program organized by Professor T. D. Lee. He received a Ph.D. degree in physics from the University of Chicago.

== Career ==
In his early career, he worked on problems in statistical physics, dynamical system and complex systems. In 1987, along with Per Bak and Kurt Wiesenfeld, he proposed the concept and developed the theory for self-organized criticality, which had and continues to have broad applications in complex systems with scale invariance. The model they used to illustrate the idea is referred to as the Bak-Tang-Wiesenfeld "sandpile" model. His current research interest is at the interface between physics and biology. Specifically, he focuses on systems biology and works on problems such as protein folding, cell cycle regulation, function-topology relationship in biological network, cell fate determination and design principles in biological systems. He was a tenured Full Professor at the University of California San Francisco before returning to China in 2011. He is a Fellow of the American Physical Society, a member of the Chinese Academy of Sciences, the founding director of the interdisciplinary Center for Quantitative Biology at Peking University and the founding Co-Editor-in-Chief of the journal Quantitative Biology.

== Selected publications ==
- Self-organized criticality
- Protein folding
- Robustness in cell cycle control
- Network topology, function and dynamics
- Cell fate determination
