= Per Bak =

Danish physicist

- Born: 8 December 1948; Brønderslev, Denmark
- Died: 16 October 2002 (aged 53); Copenhagen, Denmark
- Education: Technical University of Denmark; Risø National Laboratory
- Known for: Self-organized criticality Bak–Sneppen model Bak–Tang–Wiesenfeld sandpile
- Scientific career
- Fields: Physicist
- Workplaces: Brookhaven National Laboratory; University of Copenhagen; Santa Fe Institute; Niels Bohr Institute; Imperial College London

Per Bak (8 December 1948 – 16 October 2002) was a Danish theoretical physicist who coauthored the 1987 academic paper that coined the term "self-organized criticality."

== Life and work ==
After receiving his Ph.D. from the Technical University of Denmark in 1974, Bak worked at Brookhaven National Laboratory. He specialized in phase transitions, such as those occurring when an insulator suddenly becomes a conductor or when water freezes.

In 1987, he and two postdoctoral researchers, Chao Tang and Kurt Wiesenfeld, published an article in Physical Review Letters setting a new concept they called self-organized criticality. The first discovered example of a dynamical system displaying such self-organized criticality, the Bak-Tang-Wiesenfeld sandpile model, was named after them. This followed publication in 1986 in the Journal of Geophysical Research of a very similar model of earthquakes by Jonathan I. Katz of Washington University in St. Louis.

Faced with many skeptics, Bak pursued the implications of his theory at a number of institutions, including the Brookhaven National Laboratory, the Santa Fe Institute, the Niels Bohr Institute in Copenhagen, and Imperial College London, where he became a professor in 2000.

In 1996, he took his ideas to a broader audience with his ambitiously titled book, How Nature Works. In 2001, Bak learned that he had myelodysplastic syndrome and died from complications of a stem-cell transplant. Bak is survived by his second wife, Maya Paczuski, a fellow physicist and current professor at the University of Calgary, with whom he has coauthored papers, and his four children.

== Selected publications ==
- Bak, P (1 June 1982). "Commensurate phases, incommensurate phases and the devil's staircase". Reports on Progress in Physics. 45 (6): 587–629. doi:10.1088/0034-4885/45/6/001.
- Bak, Per; Tang, Chao; Wiesenfeld, Kurt (27 July 1987). "Self-organized criticality: an explanation of 1/f noise". Physical Review Letters. 59 (4): 381–384. Bibcode:1987PhRvL..59..381B. doi:10.1103/PhysRevLett.59.381. PMID 10035754.
- 1996, How Nature Works: The Science of Self-Organized Criticality, New York: Copernicus. ISBN 0-387-94791-4
- Bak, Per (December 1983). "Doing physics with microcomputers". Physics Today. 36 (12): 25–28. Bibcode:1983PhT....36l..25B. doi:10.1063/1.2915383.
