= Mode-coupling theory =

In statistical physics, mode-coupling theory (MCT) is a family of approximations for the dynamics of many-body systems. In MCT, a relaxation rate or transport coefficient is expressed through the nonlinear coupling of a few slow collective variables ("modes"), and the resulting equations are closed self-consistently. The name covers two bodies of work that are historically connected but differ in scope and technique:

- the mode-coupling theory of critical dynamics, developed in the 1960s mainly by Kyozi Kawasaki, which explains the anomalous transport coefficients near critical points and was later extended to long-time tails and to the kinetic theory of dense liquids;
- the mode-coupling theory of liquids and colloidal suspensions, developed from 1984 by Wolfgang Götze and co-workers.

== Common framework ==
Both variants start from the exact equations of motion for time correlation functions that follow from the projection operator formalism of Robert Zwanzig and Hazime Mori. For a normalized correlation function $\phi(t)$ of a conserved or otherwise slow variable, this formalism yields a generalized Langevin equation of the form

$$\partial_t\phi(t) + \Gamma\phi(t)
+ \int_0^t\!\mathrm{d}t'\,M(t-t')\,\phi(t') = 0,$$

where the memory kernel $M(t)$ is itself a correlation function of the fluctuating forces, which evolve under a projected dynamics. Equivalently, a transport coefficient $L$ is given by a Green–Kubo formula as the time integral of a flux autocorrelation function. These relations are exact but not closed. The mode-coupling approximation closes them in two steps:

1. the fluctuating force (or flux) is projected onto products of slow variables, typically pairs $A_{\mathbf k}B_{\mathbf q-\mathbf k}$ of Fourier components;
2. the resulting four-point correlation functions are factorized into products of two-point functions, $\langle A_{\mathbf k}(t)B_{\mathbf p}(t)\, A^*_{\mathbf k}B^*_{\mathbf p}\rangle \approx \langle A_{\mathbf k}(t)A^*_{\mathbf k}\rangle \langle B_{\mathbf p}(t)B^*_{\mathbf p}\rangle.$

The memory kernel thereby becomes a quadratic functional of the very correlation functions it determines. The so obtained equation of motion of the correlation functions is genuinely non-linear, which is decisive for the explanation slow dynamics.

== Mode coupling in critical dynamics ==
=== Origins ===
Near a critical point, fluctuations of the order parameter become large and slow, and several transport coefficients diverge or vanish. In 1962, Marshall Fixman explained the anomalous shear viscosity of critical binary mixtures by the coupling of the flow field to concentration fluctuations. Kawasaki turned this idea into a systematic method: starting from the Green–Kubo relations, he identified the parts of the fluxes that are bilinear in the slow modes and evaluated their correlations with the factorization approximation. Leo Kadanoff and Jack Swift independently applied the same concept to the liquid–gas critical point. Kawasaki's comprehensive 1970 paper and his review in the Domb–Green series became standard references.

=== Binary fluids: Kawasaki function ===
The best-known result concerns the diffusion of the order parameter (concentration in a binary mixture, density near the liquid–gas critical point). The dominant contribution to the Onsager coefficient comes from the advection of order-parameter fluctuations by transverse velocity fluctuations. If the relaxation of the order parameter is slow compared to viscous momentum diffusion, mode coupling gives

$$\lambda(\mathbf q) \simeq k_\text{B}T
\int\!\frac{\mathrm{d}^3k}{(2\pi)^3}\,
\frac{\chi(|\mathbf q-\mathbf k|)\,
\left[1-(\hat{\mathbf q}\cdot\hat{\mathbf k})^2\right]}
{\eta\,k^2},$$

where $\eta$ is the shear viscosity and $\chi(k)$ the static order-parameter susceptibility. With the Ornstein–Zernike form $\chi(k)=\chi/(1+k^2\xi^2)$ and correlation length $\xi$, the relaxation rate $\Gamma_q=q^2\lambda(q)/\chi(q)$ of a fluctuation with wavenumber $q$ becomes

$$\Gamma_q = \frac{k_\text{B}T}{6\pi\eta\,\xi^3}\,K(q\xi),\qquad
K(x) = \frac{3}{4x^2}\left[1+x^2
+\left(x^3-\frac1x\right)\arctan x\right].$$

The Kawasaki function $K(x)$ interpolates between the hydrodynamic limit $K\simeq x^2$, where the diffusion coefficient takes the Stokes–Einstein form $D=k_\text{B}T/(6\pi\eta\xi)$, as if a sphere of radius $\xi$ were diffusing, and the critical limit $K\simeq 3\pi x/8$, where $\Gamma_q=k_\text{B}T\,q^3/(16\eta)$ is independent of $\xi$. The same result was obtained by Richard Ferrell in his "decoupled-mode" theory. Measurements of the Rayleigh linewidth by dynamic light scattering, for instance in xenon near its critical point, confirmed these predictions.

=== Further applications ===
The method was soon applied to other universality classes of dynamic critical behavior:

- In ferromagnets, the coupling of spin fluctuations through the precession term yields a dynamic exponent $z=5/2$ for the isotropic Heisenberg magnet.
- At the lambda point of superfluid helium-4, the coupling of the order parameter to entropy fluctuations explains the anomalous heat conduction and the dispersion of second sound.
- In simple fluids away from any critical point, the coupling of a tagged particle's velocity to the shear modes of the surrounding fluid explains the $t^{-d/2}$ long-time tail of the velocity autocorrelation function in $d$ dimensions, discovered in molecular dynamics simulations by Alder and Wainwright. A review of this line of work was given by Pomeau and Résibois.

=== Relation to the renormalization group ===
Mode coupling is not a controlled approximation; it neglects vertex corrections. In the 1970s, the renormalization group was extended to dynamics, leading to the classification of dynamic universality classes by Hohenberg and Halperin. The dynamic renormalization group largely confirmed the mode-coupling results for the dynamic exponents: for some universality classes, such as the isotropic ferromagnet, the mode-coupling exponent is exact; for others it receives only small corrections, for instance through the weak divergence of the shear viscosity of binary fluids. Mode coupling remains in use as a practical tool for computing crossover functions such as the Kawasaki function.

=== Kinetic theory of dense liquids ===
In the 1970s, mode coupling was adapted to dense simple liquids away from critical points. The aim was a microscopic theory of the dynamic structure factor $S(q,\omega)$ at wavenumbers comparable to the inverse interparticle distance, as measured by inelastic neutron scattering. Götze and Lücke and Bosse, Götze and Lücke expressed the memory kernel of the density correlator through products of density correlators, with vertices determined by the static structure factor. Related kinetic theories were developed by Sjögren and Sjölander and by Mazenko. Götze also used a self-consistent mode-coupling ("current relaxation") theory to describe Anderson localization of electrons in random potentials. Geszti pointed out that a feedback between density fluctuations and viscosity could lead to a strong viscosity increase, anticipating a dynamic mechanism for vitrification.

Kawasaki himself later derived a stochastic equation for the density of interacting Brownian particles, now known as the Dean–Kawasaki equation, as a starting point for glassy dynamics.

== Mode-coupling theory of liquids and the glass transition ==
=== Equations of motion ===
In 1984, Bengtzelius, Götze and Sjölander and, independently, Leutheusser found that the mode-coupling equations for simple liquids possess a bifurcation: beyond a critical density, or below a critical temperature, density fluctuations no longer decay to zero. Götze interpreted this as an ideal glass transition and worked out its mathematical properties.

The central quantity is the normalized intermediate scattering function $\phi_q(t)=S(q,t)/S(q)$. For a simple liquid of particles with mass $m$ at number density $\rho$, it obeys

$$\ddot\phi_q(t) + \Omega_q^2\,\phi_q(t)
+ \nu_q\,\dot\phi_q(t)
+ \Omega_q^2\int_0^t\!\mathrm{d}t'\,m_q(t-t')\,\dot\phi_q(t') = 0,$$

with the microscopic frequency $\Omega_q^2=q^2k_\text{B}T/\left(m\,S(q)\right)$ and a damping constant $\nu_q$ for short-time processes. The memory kernel is approximated by

$$m_q(t) = \frac{\rho\,S(q)}{2q^2}
\int\!\frac{\mathrm{d}^3k}{(2\pi)^3}\,S(k)\,S(p)
\left[\hat{\mathbf q}\cdot\mathbf k\,c(k)
+\hat{\mathbf q}\cdot\mathbf p\,c(p)\right]^2
\phi_k(t)\,\phi_p(t),
\qquad \mathbf p=\mathbf q-\mathbf k,$$

where $c(k)=[1-1/S(k)]/\rho$ is the direct correlation function. The only input is the static structure factor $S(q)$; temperature and density enter through its variation. For colloids, the inertial term is replaced by Brownian short-time dynamics; the long-time predictions are the same.

=== Ideal glass transition ===
In the long-time limit, the nonergodicity parameters $f_q=\phi_q(t\to\infty)$ satisfy

$$\frac{f_q}{1-f_q} = m_q[f].$$

In the liquid, only $f_q=0$ solves this equation. At a critical point of the control parameters, for instance at a critical temperature $T_\text{c}$ or packing fraction $\varphi_\text{c}$, a nonzero solution appears discontinuously, with a critical value $f_q^\text{c}$. Beyond this point, the system is a nonergodic, amorphous solid: a fraction $f_q$ of density fluctuations is frozen. In the language of bifurcation theory, the transition is a fold bifurcation ($A_2$ singularity). For hard spheres, with $S(q)$ from the Percus–Yevick approximation, it occurs at $\varphi_\text{c}\approx0.516$.

The essential features are captured by schematic models with a single correlator. In Leutheusser's model, $m(t)=v\,\phi(t)^2$; the nontrivial solution $f=1/2$ appears at the coupling constant $v_\text{c}=4$. Models such as $m=v_1\phi+v_2\phi^2$ were studied systematically by Götze.

=== Asymptotic laws ===
Near the transition, the dynamics exhibits two relaxation steps, and MCT predicts their scaling laws in terms of the separation parameter $\sigma$, which is proportional to $T_\text{c}-T$ or to $\varphi-\varphi_\text{c}$.

β relaxation. In a window around the plateau, all correlators factorize,

$$\phi_q(t)=f_q^\text{c}+h_q\,G(t),$$

where the amplitudes $h_q$ depend on $q$ and the function $G(t)$ does not. $G$ obeys the universal equation

$$\sigma + \lambda\,G(t)^2
= \frac{\mathrm{d}}{\mathrm{d}t}\int_0^t\!\mathrm{d}t'\,G(t-t')\,G(t').$$

The single exponent parameter $\lambda$ ($1/2\le\lambda<1$) is computable from $S(q)$. It determines two exponents $a$ and $b$ through

$$\lambda = \frac{\Gamma(1-a)^2}{\Gamma(1-2a)}
= \frac{\Gamma(1+b)^2}{\Gamma(1+2b)}.$$

$G$ decays towards the plateau by a critical law $G\propto t^{-a}$ and, in the liquid, leaves the plateau by the von Schweidler law $G\propto -t^{\,b}$. The crossover time scales as $t_\sigma\propto|\sigma|^{-1/(2a)}$. In the glass, the plateau height rises as $f_q-f_q^\text{c}\propto\sqrt{\sigma}$. In the susceptibility spectrum $\chi''(\omega)$, the β relaxation appears as a minimum between the microscopic peak and the α peak.

α relaxation. The final decay from the plateau obeys time–temperature superposition, $\phi_q(t)=\tilde\phi_q(t/\tau)$, with a time scale that diverges as

$$\tau\propto|\sigma|^{-\gamma},\qquad
\gamma=\frac{1}{2a}+\frac{1}{2b}.$$

The scaling functions $\tilde\phi_q$ are well fitted by Kohlrausch functions; their stretching exponent tends to $b$ for large $q$. For hard spheres, $\lambda\approx0.735$, $a\approx0.312$, $b\approx0.583$, and $\gamma\approx2.46$. Corrections to these leading-order laws have been worked out as well.
