= George Yevick =

American physicist (1922–2011)

George Johannus Yevick
- Born: May 8, 1922; Berwick, Pennsylvania, U.S.
- Died: October 6, 2011 (aged 89); Princeton, New Jersey, U.S.
- Education: Massachusetts Institute of Technology, BS (1943), DSc (1947); Stevens Institute of Technology, Hon. M.Eng (1958)
- Known for: Percus–Yevick approximation; First e-reader
- Spouse: Miriam Yevick
- Children: David Yevick
- Scientific career
- Fields: Engineering physics; Quantum mechanics; Theoretical physics
- Institutions: Stevens Institute of Technology
- Thesis: N-Body Problem in Quantum Mechanics (1948)
- Doctoral advisor: Victor Weisskopf

George Yevick (May 8, 1922 – October 6, 2011) was an American physicist, inventor, and a Professor Emeritus at Stevens Institute of Technology. His work on the many-body problem yielded a foundation of classical fluid statistical mechanics, the Percus–Yevick approximation. He co-invented the first e-reader with Adnan Wally in 1972. He is also known for his contributions to David Bohm's work in quantum theory.

Yevick was defeated in a run for the Democratic Party primary election for U.S. Congress in New Jersey in 1964.

== Early life and education ==
Yevick was born in Berwick, Pennsylvania. He was of Jewish descent. During the Great Depression, George's Scout leader lent him money to attend the Massachusetts Institute of Technology (MIT), where he earned a Bachelor of Science in 1943 and a Doctor of Science in 1947 under the advisement of Victor Weisskopf at the MIT Radiation Laboratory. While at MIT, he met his wife Miriam Yevick (née Lipschutz), a mathematician who had escaped from Antwerp in 1940 during the Nazi occupation of Belgium. Their son, David and granddaughter, Hannah, are also physicists.

== Research and career ==
Yevick was appointed to the faculty at Stevens Institute of Technology in 1947. He spent his entire career there as a professor of Physics and Engineering Physics, and he became a Emeritus Professor in his retirement. They awarded him with an honorary degree, a Master of Engineering, in 1958.

In 1958, with Jerome K. Percus, George co-authored a foundational study on classical fluid statistical mechanics. This work was later named the Percus–Yevick approximation (PY). The approximation helped established a widely used family of liquid-state theories despite relying on uncontrolled approximations. With the hypernetted-chain equation, the PY is a foundational closure approximation for computing radial distribution functions and related thermodynamic properties of dense fluids.

Yevick and his wife corresponded frequently with David Bohm while he was at University of São Paulo. They are most known for contributing to and circulating Bohm's causal interpretation of quantum theory. Bohm also asked for Yevick's thoughts on his theory of luminiferous aether as a unification of physics using plasma physics in relation to general relativity, quantum field theory and vacuum energy. From Yevick's wife, Bohm requested a mathematical proof to support a statistical mechanics argument that rare exceptions are negligible, such that typical behavior could be treated as physically reliable. Yevick's work was later used in holographic theories of spacetime developed by David Finkelstein.

=== Inventions ===
Yevick developed more than 40 patents. In 1972, Yevick, with Adnan Wally, co-invented the first e-reader, which had an LCD that was resistant to washout. It was publicized on the front page of The New York Times and predicted to revolutionize the publishing industry. However, the invention happened in parallel with the onset of the development of ebooks by Michael S. Hart and personal computing devices, overshadowing the work and preventing its commercialization.

== Politics and advocacy ==
Yevick advocated for establishing a science and technology museum in New York City based on an educational model, featuring interactive exhibits and modern audiovisual interpretation to demonstrate basic scientific principles to the public.

A resident of Leonia, New Jersey, Yevick ran as a Democrat in the primary of the 1964 United States House of Representatives elections for a seat for New Jersey's 9th congressional district. He was defeated by Henry Helstoski. His platform was centered around civil rights. He was the elected chair of the New Jersey Democratic Council, an anti-war political group of Reform Democrats.
