= HNC =

HNC may refer to:

== Science and technology ==
- Hydrogen isocyanide, a molecule with the formula HNC that is important to the field of astrochemistry
- Heptanitrocubane, an experimental high explosive
- Classical-map Hyper-Netted-Chain equation, a method in many-body theoretical physics for interacting uniform electron liquids in two and three dimensions
- Hypernetted-chain equation, a closure relation to solve the Ornstein-Zernike equation commonly applied in statistical mechanics and fluid theory

== Other meanings ==
- Higher National Certificate, a higher education qualification in the United Kingdom
- High Negotiations Committee, a Syrian political-military opposition bloc headquartered in Riyadh
- Hopkins-Nanjing Center, a joint educational venture between Nanjing University and Johns Hopkins University located in Nanjing, China
- Habits & Contradictions, album by Schoolboy Q
- Huddersfield Narrow Canal, Northern England
