= David Yevick =

American physicist

David Owen Yevick
- Born: May 3, 1954 (age 72); New York City, New York, U.S.
- Education: Harvard University, BA (1974); Princeton University, MA (1975), PhD (1977)
- Relatives: George Yevick (father), Miriam Yevick (mother)
- Scientific career
- Fields: Mathematical physics; Computational physics; Optical communications; Solid state physics
- Workplaces: University of Waterloo; Queen's University at Kingston; Lund University
- Thesis: The induced axial vector coupling for muon-neutrino electron scattering in weak vector-like models (1977)

David Yevick (born May 3, 1954) is an American physicist, author, and professor at the University of Waterloo.

Yevick was elected Fellow of the Optical Society of America in 1990, of the American Physical Society in 1993, and of the Institute of Electrical and Electronics Engineers in 1996.

== Education and family ==
Yevick was born in New York City to Jewish parents George and Miriam Yevick (née Lipschutz). His father was a physicist who co-formulated the Percus–Yevick equation. His mother emigrated from Antwerp in 1940 during the Nazi regime. She was mathematician and was the fifth woman in history to receive a PhD from MIT in 1947.

Yevick co-authored the textbook Fundamental Math and Physics for Scientists and Engineers in 2014 with his daughter Hannah, a biophysicist.

Yevick attended undergraduate university at Harvard University, earning a Bachelor of Arts (BA) in Physics in 1974. He then attended Princeton University where he earned a Master of Arts in 1975 and a Doctor of Philosophy in 1977, both in Physics.

== Research and career ==
In 1984, he joined Lund University as a research associate. He soon joined Queen's University at Kingston, where he became a Departmental chair. In 1999, he joined the University of Waterloo.

Yevick studies how to efficiently model rare errors in communication systems, develops methods for measuring high-speed polarization behavior in optical components, and builds theoretical and numerical models that describe how polarization evolves in optical networks.

In a review of his 2005 textbook, A First Course in Computational Physics and Object-Oriented Programming with C++, Physics Today wrote Yevick’s book is a practical introduction to computational physics that effectively integrates C++ and object-oriented programming into scientific problem-solving. It describes the text as a useful resource for students and instructors, while also pointing out that some readers may find the programming sections dense or challenging.

== Awards and honors ==
- Fellow, Optical Society of America, 1990
- Fellow, American Physical Society, 1993
- Fellow, Institute of Electrical and Electronics Engineers, 1996

== Selected publications ==
- Yevick, David; Yevick, Hannah (2014). Fundamental Math and Physics for Scientists and Engineers (1 ed.). Wiley. doi:10.1002/9781118979792. ISBN 978-0-470-40784-4.
- Yevick, David (2012). A Short Course in Computational Science and Engineering: C++, Java and Octave Numerical Programming with Free Software Tools (1 ed.). Cambridge University Press. doi:10.1017/cbo9781139022262. ISBN 978-0-521-11681-7.
- Yevick, David (2005). A first course in computational physics and object-oriented programming with C++. Cambridge; New York: Cambridge University Press. ISBN 978-0-521-82778-2.
- Yevick, D. (1994). "A guide to electric field propagation techniques for guided-wave optics". Optical and Quantum Electronics. 26 (3): S185–S197. doi:10.1007/BF00384672. ISSN 0306-8919.
- Yevick, D.; Hermansson, B. (1990). "Efficient beam propagation techniques". IEEE Journal of Quantum Electronics. 26 (1): 109–112. doi:10.1109/3.44923.
- Yevick, D.; Hermansson, B. (1989). "New formulations of the matrix beam propagation method: application to rib waveguides". IEEE Journal of Quantum Electronics. 25 (2): 221–229. doi:10.1109/3.16266. ISSN 0018-9197.
