= Kirkwood–Buff solution theory =

Solution theory

The Kirkwood–Buff (KB) solution theory, due to John G. Kirkwood and Frank P. Buff, links macroscopic (bulk) properties to microscopic (molecular) details. Using statistical mechanics, the KB theory derives thermodynamic quantities from pair correlation functions between all molecules in a multi-component solution. The KB theory proves to be a valuable tool for validation of molecular simulations, as well as for the molecular-resolution elucidation of the mechanisms underlying various physical processes. For example, it has numerous applications in biologically relevant systems.

The reverse process is also possible; the so-called reverse Kirkwood–Buff (reverse-KB) theory, due to Arieh Ben-Naim, derives molecular details from thermodynamic (bulk) measurements. This advancement allows the use of the KB formalism to formulate predictions regarding microscopic properties on the basis of macroscopic information.

== The radial distribution function ==
The radial distribution function (RDF), also termed the pair distribution function or the pair correlation function, is a measure of local structuring in a mixture. The RDF between components $i$ and $j$ positioned at $\boldsymbol{r}_i$ and $\boldsymbol{r}_j$, respectively, is defined as:

$$g_{ij}(\boldsymbol{R})=\frac{\rho_{ij}(\boldsymbol{R})}{\rho_{ij}^\text{bulk}}$$

where $\rho_{ij} (\boldsymbol{R})$ is the local density of component $j$ relative to component $i$, the quantity $\rho_{ij}^\text{bulk}$ is the density of component $j$ in the bulk, and $\boldsymbol{R}= |\boldsymbol{r}_i-\boldsymbol{r}_j|$ is the inter-particle radius vector. Necessarily, it also follows that:

$$g_{ij} (\boldsymbol{R}) = g_{ji}(\boldsymbol{R})$$

Assuming spherical symmetry, the RDF reduces to:

$$g_{ij}(r)=\frac{\rho_{ij}(r)}{\rho_{ij}^\text{bulk}}$$

where $r=|\boldsymbol{R}|$ is the inter-particle distance.

In certain cases, it is useful to quantify the intermolecular correlations in terms of free energy. Specifically, the RDF is related to the potential of mean force (PMF) between the two components by:

$$PMF_{ij}(r)=-kT\ln(g_{ij})$$

where the PMF is essentially a measure of the effective interactions between the two components in the solution.

== The Kirkwood–Buff integrals ==
The Kirkwood–Buff integral (KBI) between components $i$ and $j$ is defined as the spatial integral over the pair correlation function:

$$G_{ij}=\int\limits_V [g_{ij}(\boldsymbol{R})-1]\,d\boldsymbol{R}$$

which in the case of spherical symmetry reduces to:

$G_{ij}=4\pi\int_{r=0}^\infty [g_{ij} (r)-1]r^2 \, dr$

KBI, having units of volume per molecule, quantifies the excess (or deficiency) of particle $j$ around particle $i$.

== Derivation of thermodynamic quantities ==
=== Two-component system ===
It is possible to derive various thermodynamic relations for a two-component mixture in terms of the relevant KBI ($G_{11}$, $G_{22}$, and $G_{12}$).

The partial molar volume, per molecule, of component 1 is:

$$\bar V_1=\frac{1+c_2 (G_{22}-G_{12})}{c_1+c_2+c_1c_2 (G_{11}+G_{22}-2G_{12})}$$

where $c_\alpha$ is the bulk molecular concentration of species $\alpha$ and naturally $c_1\bar V_1+c_2\bar V_2=1$

The compressibility, $\kappa$, satisfies:

$$\kappa kT=\frac{1+c_1 G_{11}+c_2 G_{22}+c_1 c_2 (G_{11}G_{22}-G_{12}^2)}{c_1+c_2+c_1 c_2 (G_{11}+G_{22}-2 G_{12})}$$

where $k$ is the Boltzmann constant and $T$ is the temperature.

The derivative of the osmotic pressure, $\Pi$, with respect to the concentration of component 2:

$$\left(\frac {\partial \Pi}{\partial c_2}\right)_{T,\mu_1}=\frac{kT}{1+c_2 G_{22}}$$

where $\mu_1$ is the chemical potential of component 1.

The derivatives of chemical potentials with respect to concentrations, at constant temperature ($T$) and pressure ($P$) are:

$$\frac{1}{kT} \left(\frac {\partial \mu_1}{\partial c_1}\right)_{T,P}=\frac{1}{c_1}+\frac{G_{12}-G_{11}}{1+c_1 (G_{11}-G_{12})}$$

$$\frac{1}{kT} \left(\frac {\partial \mu_2}{\partial c_2}\right)_{T,P}=\frac{1}{c_2}+\frac{G_{12}-G_{22}}{1+c_2 (G_{22}-G_{12})}$$

or alternatively, with respect to mole fraction:

$$\frac{1}{kT} \left(\frac {\partial \mu_2}{\partial \chi_2}\right)_{T,P}=\frac{1}{\chi_2}+\frac{c_1 (2G_{12}-G_{11}-G_{22})}{1+c_1\chi_2 (G_{11}+G_{22}-2G_{12})}$$

=== The preferential interaction coefficient ===
The relative preference of a molecular species to solvate (interact) with another molecular species is quantified using the preferential interaction coefficient, $\Gamma$. Lets consider a solution that consists of the solvent (water), solute, and cosolute. The relative (effective) interaction of water with the solute is related to the preferential hydration coefficient, $\Gamma_W$, which is positive if the solute is "preferentially hydrated". In the Kirkwood-Buff theory frame-work, and in the low concentration regime of cosolutes, the preferential hydration coefficient is:

$$\Gamma_W=M_W\left(G_{WS}-G_{CS}\right)$$

where $M_W$ is the molarity of water, and W, S, and C correspond to water, solute, and cosolute, respectively.

In the most general case, the preferential hydration is a function of the KBI of solute with both solvent and cosolute. However, under very simple assumptions and in many practical examples, it reduces to:

$$\Gamma_W=-M_{W}G_{CS}$$

So the only function of relevance is $G_{CS}$.
