= Jerome K. Percus =

American physicist and mathematician (1926–2021)

Jerome Kenneth Percus (born 21 June 1926 in New York City; died 7 March 2021) was an American physicist and mathematician known for important contributions to statistical physics, chemical physics, and applied mathematics.

In 1958, he published with George J. Yevick a groundbreaking study on the statistical mechanics of classical liquids. They formulated an integral equation (Percus–Yevick equation) that is the foundation for several approximation methods for computing the pair correlation function, and thereby allow the derivation of thermodynamic properties from first principles.

== Works ==
Percus published several books:

- Combinatorial Methods, Applied Mathematical Sciences 4, Springer 1971
- Mathematics of genome analysis, Cambridge UP 2002
- Mathematical models in developmental biology, Courant Lectures in Mathematics 26, Courant Institute of Mathematical Sciences 2015 with Stephen Childress
