= Miriam Yevick =

American mathematician (1924 – 2018)

Miriam Lipschutz Yevick
- Born: Miriam Amalie Lipschutz; August 28, 1924; Scheveningen, Netherlands
- Died: September 5, 2018 (aged 94); Valhalla, New York
- Citizenship: American; Belgian; Dutch
- Education: New York University (BA), 1943; Massachusetts Institute of Technology (MS), 1945, (PhD), 1947
- Spouse: George Yevick
- Children: David Yevick
- Scientific career
- Fields: Holography; Topology; Mathematical physics; Quantum physics
- Workplaces: National Bureau of Standards; Rutgers University College
- Thesis: The lebesgue density theorem in abstract measure spaces (1947)
- Doctoral advisor: Witold Hurewicz

Miriam Yevick (née Lipschutz; August 28, 1924 — September 5, 2018) was an American mathematician and professor at Rutgers University College. She was the fifth woman to receive a Doctor of Philosophy from Massachusetts Institute of Technology in math. She immigrated to the United States with her family after fleeing Nazi Belgium in 1940. She is known for her collaboration with David Bohm on his quantum theories.

== Education and early life ==
Yevick was born in Scheveningen to prominent diamond merchant Max Lipschutz. She was of Jewish descent. She attended Montessori school in the Hague, after which time her family relocated to Belgium where she attended Collège Marie-José. When she was 16, they immigrated to the United States in 1940 from Antwerp, fleeing the Nazi regime and was a survivor of The Holocaust. The escape took three months. She graduated from Lycée Français de New York in 1942.

She received her Bachelor of Arts from New York University in 1943. She then enrolled at Massachusetts Institute of Technology (MIT) where she earned a Master of Science in Physics in 1945, and in 1947 she became the fifth woman in history to receive a Doctor of Philosophy in Mathematics from MIT. While at MIT, she met her husband, physicist George Yevick. Their son, David, and granddaughter, Hannah, are also physicists.

== Research and career ==
Yevick began her career at the National Bureau of Standards in Washington, D.C., shortly after she met David Bohm in 1948, at which time they began an affair. Yevick and her husband remained in close contact with Bohm, and corresponded with him while he was at University of São Paulo on his causal interpretation of quantum theory. Bohm requested from Yevick a mathematical proof to support a statistical mechanics argument that rare exceptions are negligible, such that typical behavior could be treated as physically reliable. On Bohm's holonomic brain theory, Yevick postulated that the brain has the capacity to process waveforms with a Fourier logic.

She held visiting posts at the University of Victoria, Princeton University, and City College of New York. In 1964, she was appointed to a professorship at Rutgers University College, where she spent the rest of her career teaching remedial math until she retired.

On her work Holographic or fourier logic (1975), cognitive scientists William Benzon and David G. Hays formulated 'Yevick's Law' in 1988. Benzon later wrote that Miriam's work provides a foundational framework for understanding intelligence. He argues that her work shows how intelligence depends on choosing between modes of symbolic or holographic computation and that systems of artificial intelligence struggle to balance them.

In 2012, she published a memoir in the form of letters she had written to her first grandchild, A Testament for Ariela, about her life escaping from a Nazi regime to become a mathematician.
