= Compressibility equation =

Equation which relates the isothermal compressibility to the structure of the liquid

In statistical mechanics and thermodynamics the compressibility equation refers to an equation which relates the isothermal compressibility (and indirectly the pressure) to the structure of the liquid. It reads:
$$kT\left(\frac{\partial \rho}{\partial p}\right)=1+\rho \int_V \mathrm{d} \mathbf{r} [g(r)-1]$$
where $\rho$ is the number density, g(r) is the radial distribution function and $kT\left(\frac{\partial \rho}{\partial p}\right)$ is the isothermal compressibility.

Using the Fourier representation of the Ornstein-Zernike equation the compressibility equation can be rewritten in the form:

$$\frac{1}{kT}\left(\frac{\partial p}{\partial \rho}\right) = \frac{1}{1+\rho \int h(r) \mathrm{d} \mathbf{r} }=\frac{1}{1+\rho \hat{H}(0)}=1-\rho\hat{C}(0)=1-\rho \int c(r) \mathrm{d} \mathbf{r}$$

where h(r) and c(r) are the indirect and direct correlation functions respectively. The compressibility equation is one of the many integral equations in statistical mechanics.
