= Kyozi Kawasaki =

Japanese physicist (1930–2021)

Kyozi Kawasaki (川崎 恭治, Kawasaki Kyōji; 4 August 1930 — 12 November 2021) was a Japanese physicist. His research interests include chemical physics and statistical mechanics. In 2001, Kawasaki was awarded the Boltzmann Medal for "his contribution to our understanding of dynamic phenomena in condensed matter systems, in particular the mode-coupling theory of fluids near criticality, and nonlinear problems, such as critical phenomena in sheared fluids and phase separations".

== Academic background ==
Kawasaki was born on 4 August 1930 in Ōtsu, Shiga, Japan. He received his B.Sc. (1953) and M.Sc. (1955) in physics from Kyushu University, followed by his Ph.D. in physics from Duke University in 1959. He has held a number of appointments in Japan and in the United States since then.

- JSPS Research Fellow at Kyushu University (1959–1960) and Kyoto University

(1960–1962)

- Instructor, Nagoya University, 1962–1963
- Research Associate, M.I.T., 1963–1966
- Associate Professor, Kyushu University, 1966–1970
- Associate Professor, Temple University, 1970–1972
- Professor, Temple University, 1972–1973
- Professor, Research Institute for Fundamental Physics, Kyoto University,

1973-1976

- Professor, Department of Physics, Kyushu University, 1976–2001
- Professor, Department of Physics, Chubu University, 2001–2007
- Electronics Research Laboratory, Fukuoka Institute of Technology, 2008-

== Recognition ==
- Nishina Memorial Prize, 1972
- Humboldt Prize, 1992
- Boltzmann Medal, 2001
- Ulam Scholar, 2001-02
