= Hypernetted-chain equation =

Closure relation to solve the Ornstein-Zernike equation

In statistical mechanics the hypernetted-chain equation is a closure relation to solve the Ornstein–Zernike equation which relates the direct correlation function to the total correlation function. It is commonly used in fluid theory to obtain e.g. expressions for the radial distribution function. It is given by:

$$\ln y(r_{12}) =\ln g(r_{12}) + \beta u(r_{12}) =\rho \int \left[h(r_{13}) - \ln g(r_{13}) - \beta u(r_{13})\right] h(r_{23}) \, d \mathbf{r_{3}},  \,$$

where $\rho = \frac{N}{V}$ is the number density of molecules, $h(r) = g(r)-1$, $g(r)$ is the radial distribution function, $u(r)$ is the direct interaction between pairs. $\beta = \frac{1}{k_{\rm B} T}$ with $T$ being the Thermodynamic temperature and $k_{\rm B}$ the Boltzmann constant.

== Derivation ==
The direct correlation function represents the direct correlation between two particles in a system containing N − 2 other particles. It can be represented by

$$c(r)=g_{\rm total}(r) - g_{\rm indirect}(r) \,$$

where $g_{\rm total}(r)=g(r) = \exp[-\beta w(r)]$ (with $w(r)$ the potential of mean force) and $g_{\rm indirect}(r)$ is the radial distribution function without the direct interaction between pairs $u(r)$ included; i.e. we write $g_{\rm indirect}(r)=\exp\{-\beta[w(r)-u(r)]\}$. Thus we approximate $c(r)$ by

$$c(r)=e^{-\beta w(r)}- e^{-\beta[w(r)-u(r)]}. \,$$

By expanding the indirect part of $g(r)$ in the above equation and introducing the function $y(r)=e^{\beta u(r)}g(r) (= g_{\rm indirect}(r) )$ we can approximate $c(r)$ by writing:

$$c(r)=e^{-\beta w(r)}-1+\beta[w(r)-u(r)]  \,
= g(r)-1-\ln y(r)  \,
= f(r)y(r)+[y(r)-1-\ln y(r)] \,\, (\text{HNC}),$$

with $f(r) = e^{-\beta u(r)}-1$.

This equation is the essence of the hypernetted chain equation. We can equivalently write

$$h(r) - c(r) = g(r) - 1 -c(r) = \ln y(r).$$

If we substitute this result in the Ornstein–Zernike equation

$$h(r_{12})- c(r_{12}) = \rho \int  c(r_{13})h(r_{23})d \mathbf{r}_{3},$$

one obtains the hypernetted-chain equation:

$$\ln y(r_{12}) =\ln g(r_{12}) + \beta u(r_{12}) =\rho \int \left[h(r_{13}) -\ln g(r_{13}) - \beta u(r_{13})\right] h(r_{23}) \, d \mathbf{r_{3}}.  \,$$

== See also ==
- Classical-map hypernetted-chain method
- Percus–Yevick approximation – another closure relation
- Ornstein–Zernike equation
