= Ornstein–Zernike equation =

Equation in statistical mechanics

In statistical mechanics, the Ornstein–Zernike (OZ) equation is an integral equation introduced by Leonard Ornstein and Frits Zernike that relates different correlation functions with each other. Together with a closure relation, it is used to compute the structure factor and thermodynamic state functions of amorphous matter like liquids or colloids. In molecular theories of ionic solutions, this type of integral equation can be used to describe how molecules (i.e. particles, ions, and colloids), distribute space and time given their interaction energies.

== Context ==
The OZ equation has practical importance as a foundation for approximations for computing the pair correlation function of molecules or ions in liquids, or of colloidal particles. The pair correlation function is related via Fourier transform to the static structure factor, which can be determined experimentally using X-ray diffraction or neutron diffraction.

The OZ equation relates the pair correlation function to the direct correlation function. The direct correlation function is only used in connection with the OZ equation, which can actually be seen as its definition. The direct correlation function describes how particle positions are statistically correlated, after separating out the contributions propagated through other particles using OZ. Care should be taken not to confuse this with the pair potential, which expresses a particle pair interaction energy. The direct or total correlation function may be related to the pair potential through a closure relation (see below).

Besides the OZ equation, other methods for the computation of the pair correlation function include the virial expansion at low densities, and the Bogoliubov–Born–Green–Kirkwood–Yvon (BBGKY) hierarchy. Any of these methods must be combined with a physical approximation: truncation in the case of the virial expansion, a closure relation for OZ or BBGKY.

== The equation ==
To keep notation simple, we only consider homogeneous fluids. Thus the pair correlation function only depends on distance, and therefore is also called the radial distribution function. It can be written

$$g(\mathbf{r}_1,\mathbf{r}_2) = g(\mathbf{r}_1 - \mathbf{r}_2) \equiv g(\mathbf{r}_{12}) = g(|\mathbf{r}_{12}|) \equiv g(r_{12}) \equiv g(12),$$

where the first equality comes from homogeneity, the second from isotropy, and the equivalences introduce new notation.

It is convenient to define the total correlation function as:

$$h(12)\equiv g(12)-1$$

which expresses the influence of molecule 1 on molecule 2 at distance $\,r_{12}\,$. The OZ equation

$h(12) \; = \; c(12) \; + \; \rho \, \int \text{d}^3 \mathbf{r}_{3}\, c(13) \, h(32)$

splits this influence into two contributions, a direct and indirect one. The direct contribution defines the direct correlation function, $c(r).$ The indirect part is due to the influence of molecule 1 on a third, labeled molecule 3, which in turn affects molecule 2, directly and indirectly. This indirect effect is weighted by the density and averaged over all the possible positions of molecule 3.

By eliminating the indirect influence, $\,c(r)\,$ is shorter-ranged than $h(r)$ and can be more easily modelled and approximated. The radius of $\,c(r)\,$ is determined by the radius of intermolecular forces, whereas the radius of $\,h(r)\,$ is of the order of the correlation length.

== Fourier transform ==
The integral in the OZ equation is a convolution. Therefore, the OZ equation can be resolved by Fourier transform. If we denote the Fourier transforms of $h(\mathbf{r})$ and $c(\mathbf{r})$ by $\hat{h}(\mathbf{k})$ and $\hat{c}(\mathbf{k})$, respectively, and use the convolution theorem, we obtain

$$\hat{h}(\mathbf{k}) \; = \; \hat{c}(\mathbf{k}) \; + \; \rho \; \hat{h}(\mathbf{k})\;\hat{c}(\mathbf{k})~ ,$$

which yields

$$\hat{c}(\mathbf{k}) \; = \; \frac{\hat{h}(\mathbf{k})}{\;1 \;+\;\rho \;\hat{h}(\mathbf{k})\;}  \qquad \text{ and } \qquad \hat{h}(\mathbf{k}) \; = \; \frac{\hat{c}(\mathbf{k})}{\; 1 \; - \; \rho \; \hat{c}(\mathbf{k}) \;} ~.$$

The static structure factor is related to the total correlation function by

$$S(\mathbf{k})=1+\rho\hat{h}(\mathbf{k}),$$

so the Ornstein–Zernike equation also gives

$S(\mathbf{k})=\frac{1}{1-\rho\hat{c}(\mathbf{k})}.$

== Closure relations ==
The purely formal Ornstein–Zernike equation relates the total and direct pair correlation functions, $\,h \,$ and $\,c \,$, but does not determine their values. An additional, physically motivated relation is needed to predict these correlations, known as a closure relation.

In the low-density limit, the pair correlation function is given by the Boltzmann factor,

$$g(12)=\text{e}^{-\beta u(12)},\quad \rho\to 0$$

with $\beta=1/k_\text{B} T$ and with the pair potential $u(r)$.

Closure relations for higher densities modify this simple relation in different ways. The best known closure approximations are:

- The Percus–Yevick approximation for particles with impenetrable ("hard") core,
- the hypernetted-chain approximation, for particles with soft cores and attractive potential tails,
- the mean spherical approximation,
- the Rogers-Young approximation.

The latter two interpolate in different ways between the former two, and thereby achieve a satisfactory description of particles that have a hard core and attractive forces.

== See also ==
- Hypernetted-chain equation – closure relation
- Percus–Yevick approximation – closure relation
