= Percus–Yevick approximation =

Equation in statistical mechanics

In statistical mechanics the Percus–Yevick approximation is a closure relation to solve the Ornstein–Zernike equation. It is also referred to as the Percus–Yevick equation. It is commonly used in fluid theory to obtain e.g. expressions for the radial distribution function. The approximation is named after Jerome K. Percus and George J. Yevick.

== Derivation ==
The direct correlation function represents the direct correlation between two particles in a system containing N − 2 other particles. It can be represented by

$$c(r)=g_{\rm total}(r) - g_{\rm indirect}(r) \,$$

where $g_{\rm total}(r)$ is the radial distribution function, i.e. $g(r)=\exp[-\beta w(r)]$ (with w(r) the potential of mean force) and $g_{\rm indirect}(r)$ is the radial distribution function without the direct interaction between pairs $u(r)$ included; i.e. we write $g_{\rm indirect}(r)=\exp[-\beta(w(r)-u(r))]$. Thus we approximate c(r) by

$$c(r)=e^{-\beta w(r)}- e^{-\beta[w(r)-u(r)]}. \,$$

If we introduce the function $y(r)=e^{\beta u(r)}g(r)$ into the approximation for c(r) one obtains

$$c(r)=g(r)-y(r)=e^{-\beta u}y(r)-y(r)=f(r)y(r). \,$$

This is the essence of the Percus–Yevick approximation for if we substitute this result in the Ornstein–Zernike equation, one obtains the Percus–Yevick equation:

$$y(r_{12})=1+\rho \int f(r_{13})y(r_{13})h(r_{23}) d \mathbf{r_{3}}.   \,$$

The approximation was defined by Percus and Yevick in 1958.

== Hard spheres ==
Static structure factor of the hard-spheres liquid in Percus–Yevick approximation at three different packing ratios.

For hard spheres, the potential u(r) is either zero or infinite, and therefore the Boltzmann factor $\text{e}^{-u/k_\text{B}T}$ is either one or zero, regardless of temperature T. Therefore structure of a hard-spheres fluid is temperature independent. This leaves just two parameters: the hard-core radius R (which can be eliminated by rescaling distances or wavenumbers), and the packing fraction η (which has a maximum value of 0.64 for random close packing).

Under these conditions, the Percus–Yevick equation has an analytical solution, obtained by Wertheim in 1963.

=== Solution as C code ===
The static structure factor of the hard-spheres fluid in Percus–Yevick approximation can be computed using the following C function:

double py(double qr, double eta)
{
    const double a = pow(1+2*eta, 2)/pow(1-eta, 4);
    const double b = -6*eta*pow(1+eta/2, 2)/pow(1-eta, 4);
    const double c = eta/2*pow(1+2*eta, 2)/pow(1-eta, 4);
    const double A = 2*qr;
    const double A2 = A*A;
    const double G = a/A2*(sin(A)-A*cos(A))
        + b/A/A2*(2*A*sin(A)+(2-A2)*cos(A)-2)
        + c/pow(A,5)*(-pow(A,4)*cos(A)+4*((3*A2-6)*cos(A)+A*(A2-6)*sin(A)+6));

    return 1/(1+24*eta*G/A);
}

== Hard spheres in shear flow ==
For hard spheres in shear flow, the function u(r) arises from the solution to the steady-state two-body Smoluchowski convection–diffusion equation or two-body Smoluchowski equation with shear flow. An approximate analytical solution to the Smoluchowski convection-diffusion equation was found using the method of matched asymptotic expansions by Banetta and Zaccone in Ref.

This analytical solution can then be used together with the Percus–Yevick approximation in the Ornstein-Zernike equation. Approximate solutions for the pair distribution function in the extensional and compressional sectors of shear flow and hence the angular-averaged radial distribution function can be obtained, as shown in Ref., which are in good parameter-free agreement with numerical data up to packing fractions $\eta \approx 0.5$.

== See also ==
- Hypernetted-chain equation – another closure relation
- Ornstein–Zernike equation
