= Potential of mean force =

In chemistry, average force on a particle

When examining a system computationally one may be interested in knowing how the free energy changes as a function of some inter- or intramolecular coordinate (such as the distance between two atoms or a torsional angle). The free energy surface along the chosen coordinate is referred to as the potential of mean force (PMF). If the system of interest is in a solvent, then the PMF also incorporates the solvent effects.

== General description ==
The PMF can be obtained in Monte Carlo or molecular dynamics simulations to examine how a system's energy changes as a function of some specific reaction coordinate parameter. For example, it may examine how the system's energy changes as a function of the distance between two residues, or as a protein is pulled through a lipid bilayer. It can be a geometrical coordinate or a more general energetic (solvent) coordinate. Often PMF simulations are used in conjunction with umbrella sampling, because typically the PMF simulation will fail to adequately sample the system space as it proceeds.

== Mathematical description ==
The Potential of Mean Force of a system with N particles is by construction the potential that gives the average force over all the configurations of all the n+1...N particles acting on a particle j at any fixed configuration keeping fixed a set of particles 1...n

$$-\nabla_jw^{(n)} \, = \, \frac {\int e^{-\beta V} (- \nabla_j V)d q_{n+1}\dots dq_N }  {\int e^{-\beta V} d q_{n+1}\dots dq_N} ,~ j =1,2,\dots,n$$

Above, $-\nabla_jw^{(n)}$ is the averaged force, i.e. "mean force" on particle j. And $w^{(n)}$ is the so-called potential of mean force. For $n=2$, $w^{(2)}(r)$ is the average work needed to bring the two particles from infinite separation to a distance $r$. It is also related to the radial distribution function of the system, $g(r)$, by:

$$g(r) = e^{-\beta w^{(2)}(r)}$$

== Application ==
The potential of mean force $w^{(2)}$ is usually applied in the Boltzmann inversion method as a first guess for the effective pair interaction potential that ought to reproduce the correct radial distribution function in a mesoscopic simulation. Lemkul et al. have used steered molecular dynamics simulations to calculate the potential of mean force to assess the stability of Alzheimer's amyloid protofibrils. Gosai et al. have also used umbrella sampling simulations to show that potential of mean force decreases between thrombin and its aptamer (a protein-ligand complex) under the effect of electrical fields.

== See also ==
- Statistical potential
- Free energy perturbation
- Potential energy surface
