= Structure of liquids and glasses =

Atomic-scale non-crystalline structure of liquids and glasses

The structure of liquids, glasses and other non-crystalline solids is characterized by the absence of long-range order which defines crystalline materials. Liquids and amorphous solids do, however, possess a rich and varied array of short to medium range order, which originates from chemical bonding and related interactions. Metallic glasses, for example, are typically well described by the dense random packing of hard spheres, whereas covalent systems, such as silicate glasses, have sparsely packed, strongly bound, tetrahedral network structures. These very different structures result in materials with very different physical properties and applications.

The study of liquid and glass structure aims to gain insight into their behavior and physical properties, so that they can be understood, predicted and tailored for specific applications. Since the structure and resulting behavior of liquids and glasses is a complex many body problem, historically it has been too computationally intensive to solve using quantum mechanics directly. Instead, a variety of diffraction, nuclear magnetic resonance (NMR), molecular dynamics, and Monte Carlo simulation techniques are most commonly used.

Structure of a classical monatomic liquid. Atoms have many nearest neighbors in contact, yet no long-range order is present.

== Pair distribution functions and structure factors ==
Radial distribution function of the Lennard-Jones model fluid

The pair distribution function (or pair correlation function) of a material describes the probability of finding an atom at a separation r from another atom.

A typical plot of g versus r of a liquid or glass shows a number of key features:

1. At short separations (small r), g(r) = 0. This indicates the effective width of the atoms, which limits their distance of approach.
2. A number of obvious peaks and troughs are present. These peaks indicate that the atoms pack around each other in 'shells' of nearest neighbors. Typically the 1st peak in g(r) is the strongest feature. This is due to the relatively strong chemical bonding and repulsion effects felt between neighboring atoms in the 1st shell.
3. The attenuation of the peaks at increasing radial distances from the center indicates the decreasing degree of order from the center particle. This illustrates vividly the absence of "long-range order" in liquids and glasses.
4. At long ranges, g(r) approaches a limiting value of 1, which corresponds to the macroscopic density of the material.

The static structure factor, S(q), which can be measured with diffraction techniques, is related to its corresponding g(r) by Fourier transformation

$S(q)-1=\frac{4\pi\rho}{ q} \int_{0}^{\infty} r[g(r)-1]\sin{(qr)}{d}r$	1

where q is the magnitude of the momentum transfer vector, and ρ is the number density of the material. Like g(r), the S(q) patterns of liquids and glasses have a number of key features:

1. For monoatomic systems the S(q=0) limit is related to the isothermal compressibility. Also a rise at the low-q limit indicates the presence of small angle scattering, due to large scale structure or voids in the material.
2. The sharpest peaks (or troughs) in S(q) typically occur in the q=1–3 ångström range. These normally indicate the presence of some medium range order corresponding to structure in the 2nd and higher coordination shells in g(r).
3. At high-q the structure is typically a decaying sinusoidal oscillation, with a 2π/r_{1} wavelength where r_{1} is the 1st shell peak position in g(r).
4. At very high-q the S(q) tends to 1, consistent with its definition.

=== Diffraction ===
The absence of long-range order in liquids and glasses is evidenced by the absence of Bragg peaks in X-ray and neutron diffraction. For these isotropic materials, the diffraction pattern has circular symmetry, and in the radial direction, the diffraction intensity has a smooth oscillatory shape. This diffracted intensity is usually analyzed to give the static structure factor, S(q), where q is given by q=4πsin(θ)/λ, where 2θ is the scattering angle (the angle between the incident and scattered quanta), and λ is the incident wavelength of the probe (photon or neutron). Typically diffraction measurements are performed at a single (monochromatic) λ, and diffracted intensity is measured over a range of 2θ angles, to give a wide range of q. Alternatively a range of λ, may be used, allowing the intensity measurements to be taken at a fixed or narrow range of 2θ. In x-ray diffraction, such measurements are typically called "energy dispersive", whereas in neutron diffraction this is normally called "time-of-flight" reflecting the different detection methods used. Once obtained, an S(q) pattern can be Fourier transformed to provide a corresponding radial distribution function (or pair correlation function), denoted in this article as g(r). For an isotropic material, the relation between S(q) and its corresponding g(r) is

$g(r)-1=\frac{1}{2\pi^2\rho r} \int_{0}^{\infty} q[S(q)-1]\sin{(qr)}{d}q$	2

The g(r), which describes the probability of finding an atom at a separation r from another atom, provides a more intuitive description of the atomic structure. The g(r) pattern obtained from a diffraction measurement represents a spatial, and thermal average of all the pair correlations in the material, weighted by their coherent cross-sections with the incident beam.

=== Atomistic simulation ===
By definition, g(r) is related to the average number of particles found within a given volume of shell located at a distance r from the center. The average density of atoms at a given radial distance from another atom is given by the formula:

$g(r) = \frac{n(r)}{\rho 4\pi r^2 \Delta r}$	3

where n(r) is the mean number of atoms in a shell of width Δr at distance r. The g(r) of a simulation box can be calculated easily by histograming the particle separations using the following equation

$g_{ab}(r) = \frac{1}{N_{a} N_b}\sum\limits_{i=1}^{N_a} \sum\limits_{j=1}^{N_b} \langle \delta( \vert \mathbf{r}_{ij} \vert -r)\rangle$	4

where N_{a} is the number of a particles, |r_{ij}| is the magnitude of the separation of the pair of particles i,j. Atomistic simulations can also be used in conjunction with interatomic pair potential functions in order to calculate macroscopic thermodynamic parameters such as the internal energy, Gibbs free energy, entropy and enthalpy of the system.

== Theories of glass formation and criterion ==
=== Structural theory of glass formation, Zachariasen ===
While studying glass, Zachariasen began to notice repeating properties in glasses. He postulated rules and patterns that, when atoms followed these rules, they were likely to form glasses. The following rules make up Zachariasen's theory, applying only to oxide glasses.

1. Each oxygen atom in a glass can be bonded to no more than two glass-forming cations
1. The coordination number of the glass forming cation is 3 or 4
2. The oxygen coordination polyhedra only share corners, not edges or faces
3. At least 3 corners of every polyhedra must be shared, creating a continuous random network.

All of these rules provide the correct amount of flexibility to form a glass and not a crystal.

While these rules only apply to oxide glasses, they were the first rules to establish the idea of a continuous random network for glass structure. He was also the first to classify structural roles for various oxides, some being main glass formers (SiO_{2}, GeO_{2}, P_{2}O_{5}), and some being glass modifiers (Na_{2}O, CaO).

=== Energy criterion of K.H. Sun ===
This criterion established a connection between the chemical bond strength and its glass forming tendency. When a material is quenched to form glass, the stronger the bonds, the easier the glass formation.

- If a bond strength is higher than 80 kcal per bond (high bond strength), it will be glass network forming, meaning it is likely to form a glass.
- If a bond strength is less than 60 kcal per bond (low bond strength), it will be glass network modifying, since it would only form weak bonds, it would disrupt glass forming networks.
- If a bond strength is between 60 and 80 kcal per bond (intermediate bond strength, it will be an intermediate. This means it will not form a glass on its own, but it partially can while combined with other network forming atoms.

=== Dietzel's field strength criterion ===
Dietzel looked at direct Coulombic interactions between atoms. He categorized cations using field strength where FS=z_{c}/(r_{c}+r_{a})^{2}, where z_{c} is the charge of the cation, and r_{c} and r_{a} are the radii of the cation and anion respectively. High field strength cations would have a high cation-oxygen bond energy.

- If FS was greater than 1.3 (small cation with high charge), it would be a glass network former.
- If FS was less than 0.4 (large cation with small charge), it would be a glass network modifier.
- If FS was between 0.4 and 1.3 (medium-sized cation with medium charge) it would be an intermediate.

These three criterion help establish three different ways to determine whether or not certain oxides molecules will form glasses, and the likeliness of it.

== Other techniques ==
Other experimental techniques often employed to study the structure of glasses include nuclear magnetic resonance, X-ray absorption fine structure and other spectroscopy methods including Raman spectroscopy. Experimental measurements can be combined with computer simulation methods, such as reverse Monte Carlo or molecular dynamics simulations, to obtain more complete and detailed description of the atomic structure.

== Network glasses ==
The random network structure of glassy SiO_{2} in two-dimensions. Note that, as in the crystal, each silicon atom is bonded to 4 oxygen atoms, where the fourth oxygen atom is obscured from view in this plane.

The periodic crystalline lattice structure of SiO_{2} in two-dimensions

Early theories relating to the structure of glass included the crystallite theory whereby glass is an aggregate of crystallites (extremely small crystals). However, structural determinations of vitreous SiO_{2} and GeO_{2} made by Warren and co-workers in the 1930s using x-ray diffraction showed the structure of glass to be typical of an amorphous solid In 1932, Zachariasen introduced the random network theory of glass in which the nature of bonding in the glass is the same as in the crystal but where the basic structural units in a glass are connected in a random manner in contrast to the periodic arrangement in a crystalline material. Despite the lack of long range order, the structure of glass does exhibit a high degree of ordering on short length scales due to the chemical bonding constraints in local atomic polyhedra. For example, the SiO_{4} tetrahedra that form the fundamental structural units in silica glass represent a high degree of order, i.e. every silicon atom is coordinated by 4 oxygen atoms and the nearest neighbour Si-O bond length exhibits only a narrow distribution throughout the structure. The tetrahedra in silica also form a network of ring structures which leads to ordering on more intermediate length scales of up to approximately 10 angstroms.

The structure of glasses differs from the structure of liquids just above the glass transition temperature T_{g} which is revealed by the XRD analysis and high-precision measurements of third- and fifth-order non-linear dielectric susceptibilities. Glasses are generally characterised by a higher degree of connectivity compared liquids.

Alternative views of the structure of liquids and glasses include the interstitialcy model and the model of string-like correlated motion. Molecular dynamics computer simulations indicate these two models are closely connected

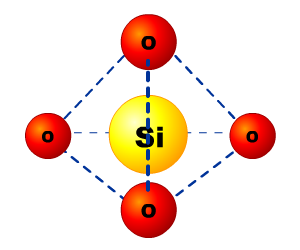
Tetrahedral structural unit of silica (SiO_{2}), the basic building block of common glasses

Oxide glass components can be classified as network formers, intermediates, or network modifiers. Traditional network formers (e.g. silicon, boron, germanium) form a highly cross-linked network of chemical bonds. Intermediates (e.g. titanium, aluminium, zirconium, beryllium, magnesium, zinc) can behave both as a network former or a network modifier, depending on the glass composition. The modifiers (calcium, lead, lithium, sodium, potassium) alter the network structure; they are usually present as ions, compensated by nearby non-bridging oxygen atoms, bound by one covalent bond to the glass network and holding one negative charge to compensate for the positive ion nearby. Some elements can play multiple roles; e.g. lead can act both as a network former (Pb^{4+} replacing Si^{4+}), or as a modifier. The presence of non-bridging oxygens lowers the relative number of strong bonds in the material and disrupts the network, decreasing the viscosity of the melt and lowering the melting temperature.

The alkali metal ions are small and mobile; their presence in a glass allows a degree of electrical conductivity. Their mobility decreases the chemical resistance of the glass, allowing leaching by water and facilitating corrosion. Alkaline earth ions, with their two positive charges and requirement for two non-bridging oxygen ions to compensate for their charge, are much less mobile themselves and hinder diffusion of other ions, especially the alkali's. The most common commercial glass types contain both alkali and alkaline earth ions (usually sodium and calcium), for easier processing and satisfying corrosion resistance. Corrosion resistance of glass can be increased by dealkalization, removal of the alkali ions from the glass surface by reaction with sulphur or fluorine compounds. Presence of alkaline metal ions has also detrimental effect to the loss tangent of the glass, and to its electrical resistance; glass manufactured for electronics (sealing, vacuum tubes, lamps ...) have to take this in account.

=== Crystalline SiO_{2} ===
Silica (the chemical compound SiO_{2}) has a number of distinct crystalline forms: quartz, tridymite, cristobalite, and others (including the high pressure polymorphs stishovite and coesite). Nearly all of them involve tetrahedral SiO_{4} units linked together by shared vertices in different arrangements. Si-O bond lengths vary between the different crystal forms. For example, in α-quartz the bond length is 161 pm, whereas in α-tridymite it ranges from 154 to 171 pm. The Si–O–Si bond angle also varies from 140° in α-tridymite to 144° in α-quartz to 180° in β-tridymite.

=== Glassy SiO_{2} ===
In amorphous silica (fused quartz), the SiO_{4} tetrahedra form a network that does not exhibit any long-range order. However, the tetrahedra themselves represent a high degree of local ordering, i.e. every silicon atom is coordinated by 4 oxygen atoms and the nearest neighbour Si-O bond length exhibits only a narrow distribution throughout the structure. If one considers the atomic network of silica as a mechanical truss, this structure is isostatic, in the sense that the number of constraints acting between the atoms equals the number of degrees of freedom of the latter. According to the rigidity theory, this allows this material to show a great forming ability. Despite the lack of ordering on extended length scales, the tetrahedra also form a network of ring-like structures which lead to ordering on intermediate length scales (up to approximately 10 angstroms or so). Under the application of high pressure (approximately 40 GPa) silica glass undergoes a continuous polyamorphic phase transition into an octahedral form, i.e. the Si atoms are surrounded by 6 oxygen atoms instead of four in the ambient pressure tetrahedral glass.

== See also ==
- Amorphous solid
- Chemical structure
- Glass
- Liquid
- Neutron diffraction
- Pair distribution function
- Polyamorphism
- Structure factor
- Surface layering
- X-ray diffraction
