= Francesco Sciortino =

Italian physicist

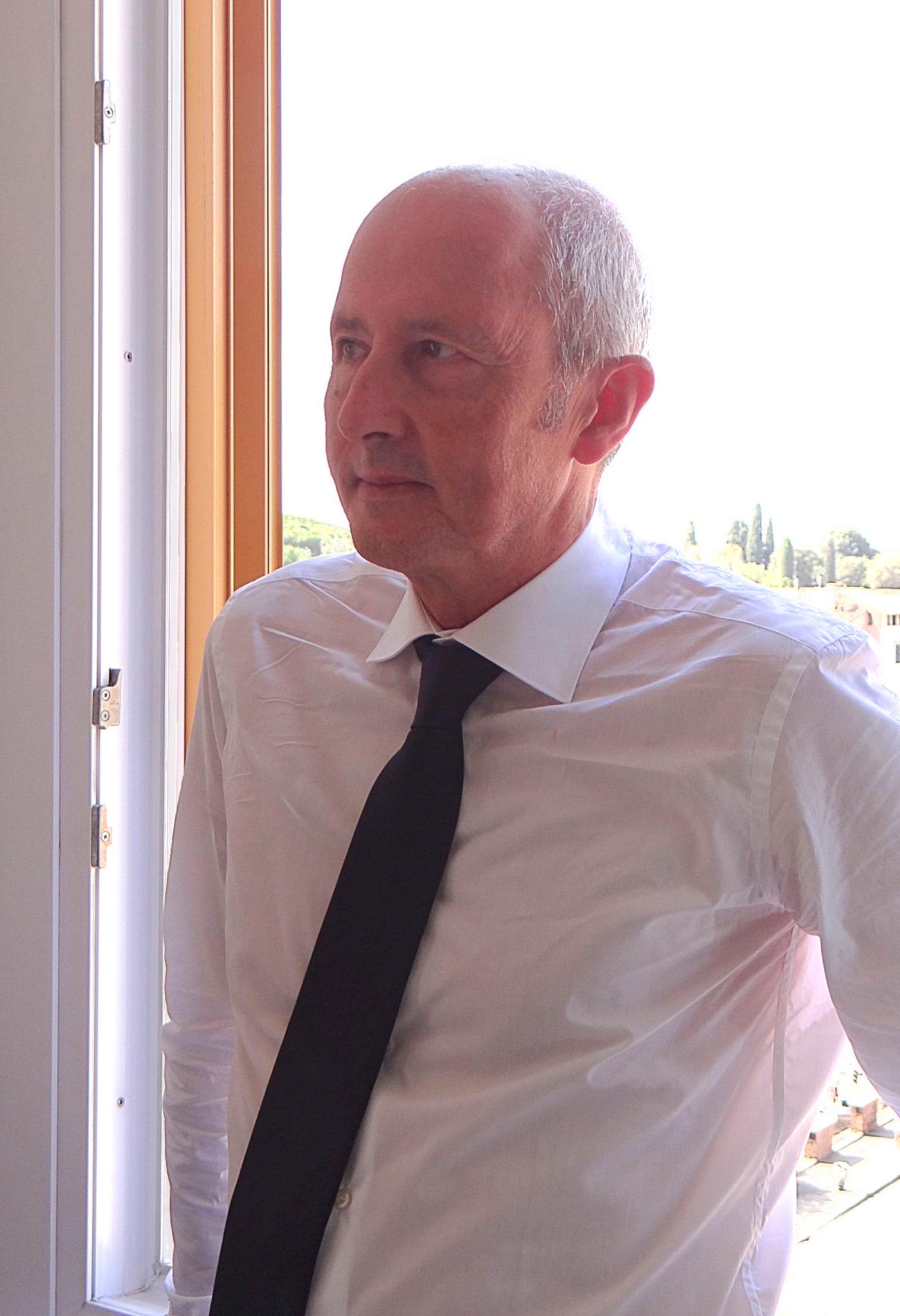
- Francesco Sciortino in 2020
- Born: December 1960 (age 65); Palermo
- Education: University of Palermo (PhD)
- Known for: Liquid–liquid critical point in water Glasses and gels Colloidal self-assembly
- Scientific career
- Fields: Computational Physics; Soft Matter; Materials Science
- Workplaces: Sapienza University of Rome; Centro di Ricerca, Sviluppo e Studi Superiori in Sardegna; Boston University; University of Palermo
- Website: www.roma1.infn.it/~sciortif/

Francesco Sciortino (born December 29, 1960) is an Italian physicist and full professor at Sapienza University of Rome. He has made seminal contributions to statistical physics, including the thermodynamic and dynamic theory of complex fluids like water, colloids, colloidal-polymer mixtures, patchy particles, and DNA-based materials. He is one of the original proponents of the "second liquid critical point" theory of water.

== Education ==
Sciortino was awarded a Ph.D. in physics from the University of Palermo in 1989 working on the coupling between biomolecules and the solvent, and focusing on the role of water's hydrogen bond cooperativity in supramolecular arrangement of biomolecules. After the Ph.D., Sciortino became research assistant in the Center for Polymer Studies of Boston University, working in the group of Prof. H. Eugene Stanley.

== Academic career ==
Following his postdoctoral research position in Boston, in 1992 Sciortino became a researcher in Centro di Ricerca, Sviluppo e Studi Superiori in Sardegna, Cagliari. One year later he moved to Sapienza University of Rome, where he became assistant professor in 1993, associate professor in 2000, and full professor in 2005. He serves as associate editor of the Journal of Chemical Physics.

== Research and achievements ==
Sciortino has made seminal contributions in the field of statistical mechanics and soft condensed matter theory. He is one of the original proponents of the Second Liquid Critical Point Hypothesis for water,. which explains water's anomalous behaviour with the presence of a hidden critical point in supercooled water. Experimental verification of this hypothesis has been obtained numerically in several models of water, and finally confirmed with scattering experiments using X-ray pulses.

Sciortino has worked extensively on the physics of arrested states of matter, making seminal contribution to Mode Coupling theory and the Potential Energy Landscape formalism. He and his collaborators hypothesised a novel type of glass (re-entrant glass) in short-range attractive colloidal systems, and this prediction was later confirmed by several experiments and numerical simulations. Sciortino and his co-authors were also the first to identify colloidal gels as the outcome of a dynamical arrested phase separation process. His contributions to the physics of reduced valence interactions are numerous: the discovery of empty liquids, equilibrium gels, re-entrant topological transitions in network fluids, among many others.

According to Scopus, Sciortino's work has been cited 27315 times, and his H-index is 93. Google Scholar lists 38415 citations and an H-index of 105. Thanks to these bibliometric indexes, he is ranked among the top 10 Italian Physicists in activity.
