= Polyamorphism =

Ability of a substance to exist in more than one distinct amorphous state

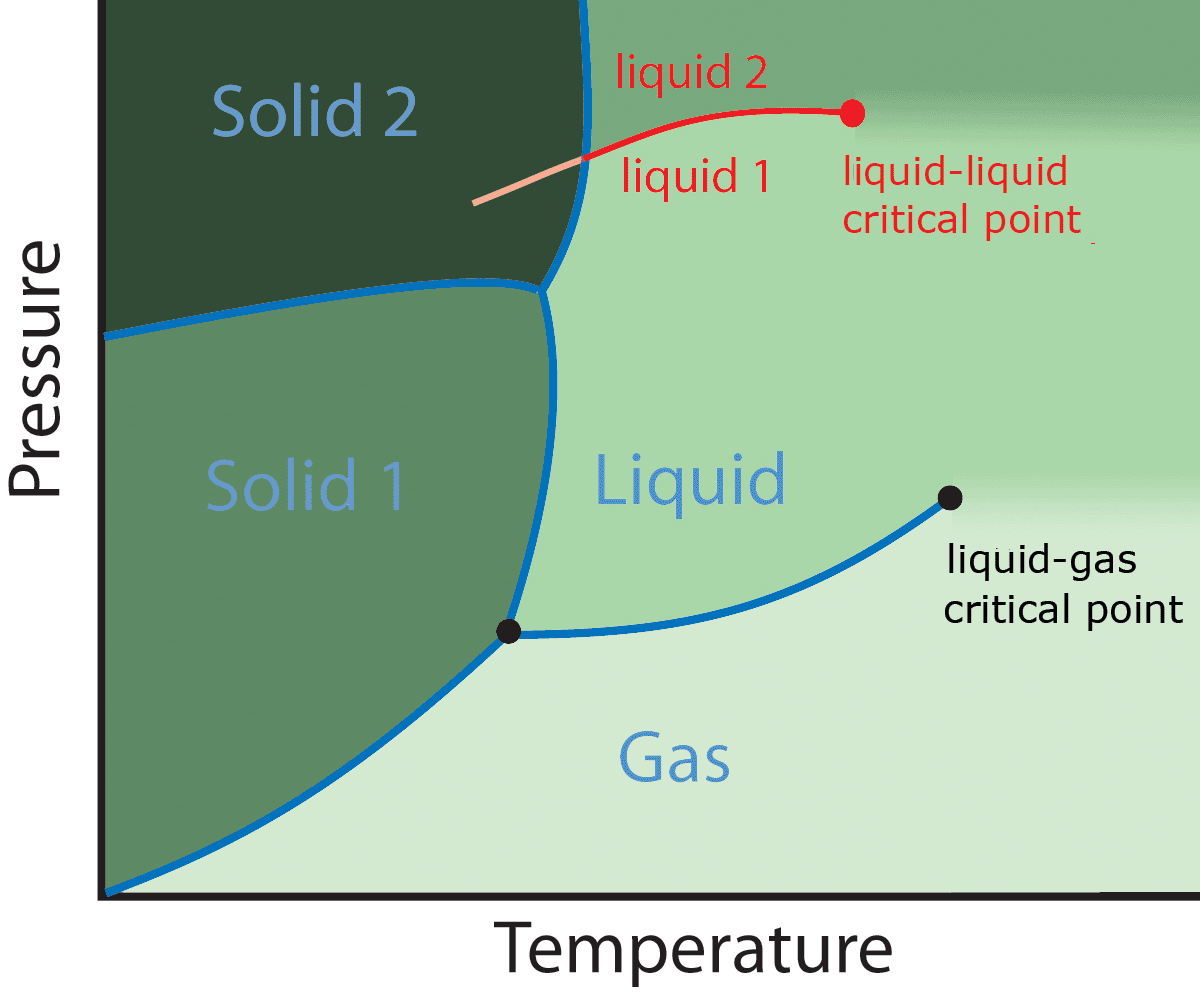
Pressure–temperature phase diagram, including an illustration of the liquid–liquid transition line proposed for several polyamorphous materials. This liquid–liquid phase transition would be a first order, discontinuous transition between low and high density liquids (labelled 1 and 2). This is analogous to polymorphism of crystalline materials, where different stable crystalline states (solid 1, 2 in diagram) of the same substance can exist (e.g. diamond and graphite are two polymorphs of carbon). Like the ordinary liquid–gas transition, the liquid–liquid transition is expected to end in a liquid-liquid critical point. At temperatures beyond these critical points there is a continuous range of fluid states, i.e. the distinction between liquids and gasses is lost. If crystallisation is avoided the liquid–liquid transition can be extended into the metastable supercooled liquid regime.

Schematic of interatomic pair potentials. The blue line is a typical Lennard-Jones type potential, which exhibits the ordinary liquid–gas critical point. The red line is a double well type potential, which is proposed for polyamorphous systems. The grey line, is a representative of the soft core square well potentials, which in atomisitc simulations exhibit liquid–liquid transitions and a second critical point. The numbers 1 and 2 correspond to the 1st and second minima in the potentials.

Polyamorphism is the ability of a substance to exist in several different amorphous modifications. It is analogous to the polymorphism of crystalline materials. Many amorphous substances can exist with different amorphous characteristics (e.g. polymers). However, polyamorphism requires two distinct amorphous states with a clear, discontinuous (first-order) phase transition between them. When such a transition occurs between two stable liquid states, a polyamorphic transition may also be referred to as a liquid–liquid phase transition.

== Overview ==
Even though amorphous materials exhibit no long-range periodic atomic ordering, there is still significant and varied local structure at inter-atomic length scales (see structure of liquids and glasses). Different local structures can produce amorphous phases of the same chemical composition with different physical properties such as density. In several cases sharp transitions have been observed between two different density amorphous states of the same material. Amorphous ice is one important example (see also examples below). Several of these transitions (including water) are expected to end in a second critical point.

== Liquid–liquid transitions ==
Polyamorphism may apply to all amorphous states, i.e. glasses, other amorphous solids, supercooled liquids, ordinary liquids or fluids. A liquid–liquid transition however, is one that occurs only in the liquid state (red line in the phase diagram, top right). In this article liquid–liquid transitions are defined as transitions between two liquids of the same chemical substance. Elsewhere the term liquid–liquid transition may also refer to the more common transitions between liquid mixtures of different chemical composition.

The stable liquid state unlike most glasses and amorphous solids, is a thermodynamically stable equilibrium state. Thus new liquid–liquid or fluid-fluid transitions in the stable liquid (or fluid) states are more easily analysed than transitions in amorphous solids where arguments are complicated by the non-equilibrium, non-ergodic nature of the amorphous state.

=== Rapoport's theory ===
Liquid–liquid transitions were originally considered by Rapoport in 1967 in order to explain high pressure melting curve maxima of some liquid metals. Rapoport's theory invokes a two-state model for liquids consisting of coexisting low-density liquid (LDL) and high-density liquid (HDL) phases. These phases have local structures reminiscent of their low- and high-pressure solid polymorphic states.

=== Double well potentials ===
One physical explanation for polyamorphism is the existence of a double well inter-atomic pair potential (see lower right diagram). It is well known that the ordinary liquid–gas critical point appears when the inter-atomic pair potential contains a minimum. At lower energies (temperatures) particles trapped in this minimum condense into the liquid state. At higher temperatures however, these particles can escape the well and the sharp definition between liquid and gas is lost. Molecular modelling has shown that addition of a second well produces an additional transition between two different liquids (or fluids) with a second critical point.

== Examples of polyamorphism ==
Polyamorphism has been experimentally observed or theoretically suggested in silicon, liquid phosphorus, triphenyl phosphate, mannitol, and in some other molecular network-forming substances.

=== Water and structural analogues ===
The most famous case of polyamorphism is amorphous ice. Pressurizing conventional hexagonal ice crystals to about 1.6 GPa at liquid nitrogen temperature (77 K) converts them to the high-density amorphous ice. Upon releasing the pressure, this phase is stable and has density of 1.17 g/cm^{3} at 77 K and 1 bar. Consequent warming to 127 K at ambient pressure transforms this phase to a low-density amorphous ice (0.94 g/cm^{3} at 1 bar). Yet, if the high-density amorphous ice is warmed up to 165 K not at low pressures but keeping the 1.6 GPa compression, and then cooled back to 77 K, then another amorphous ice is produced, which has even higher density of 1.25 g/cm^{3} at 1 bar. All those amorphous forms have very different vibrational lattice spectra and intermolecular distances. A similar abrupt liquid-amorphous phase transition is predicted in liquid silicon when cooled under high pressures. This observation is based on first principles molecular dynamics computer simulations, and might be expected intuitively since tetrahedral amorphous carbon, silicon, and germanium are known to be structurally analogous to water.

=== Oxide liquids and glasses ===
Yttria-alumina melts are another system reported to exhibit polyamorphism. Observation of a liquid–liquid phase transition in the supercooled liquid has been reported. Though this is disputed in the literature. Polyamorphism has also been reported in Yttria-Alumina glasses. Yttria-Alumina melts quenched from about 1900 °C at a rate ~400 °C/s, can form glasses containing a second co-existing phase. This happens for certain Y/Al ratios (about 20–40 mol% Y_{2}O_{3}). The two phases have the same average composition but different density, molecular structure and hardness. However whether the second phase is glassy or crystalline is also debated. Continuous changes in density were observed upon cooling silicon dioxide or germanium dioxide. Although continuous density changes do not constitute a first order transition, they may be indicative of an underlying abrupt transition.

=== Organic materials ===
Polyamorphism has also been observed in organic compounds, such as liquid triphenyl phosphite at temperatures between 210 K and 226 K and n-butanol at temperatures between 120 K and 140 K.

Polyamorphism is also an important area in pharmaceutical science. The amorphous form of a drug typically has much better aqueous solubility (compared to the analogous crystalline form) but the actual local structure in an amorphous pharmaceutical can be different, depending on the method used to form the amorphous phase. Mannitol is the first pharmaceutical substance featuring polyamorphism. In addition to the regular amorphous phase, a second amorphous phase can be prepared at room temperature and pressure. This new phase has substantially lower energy, lower density and higher glass transition temperature. Since mannitol is widely used in pharmaceutical tablet formulations, mannitol polyamorphism offers a powerful tool to engineer the property and behavior of tablets.

== See also ==
- Glass
- Liquid
- Amorphous solid
- structure of liquids and glasses
- polymorphism (materials science)
- Pair distribution function
