= Sharon Glotzer =

American physicist

Sharon C. Glotzer
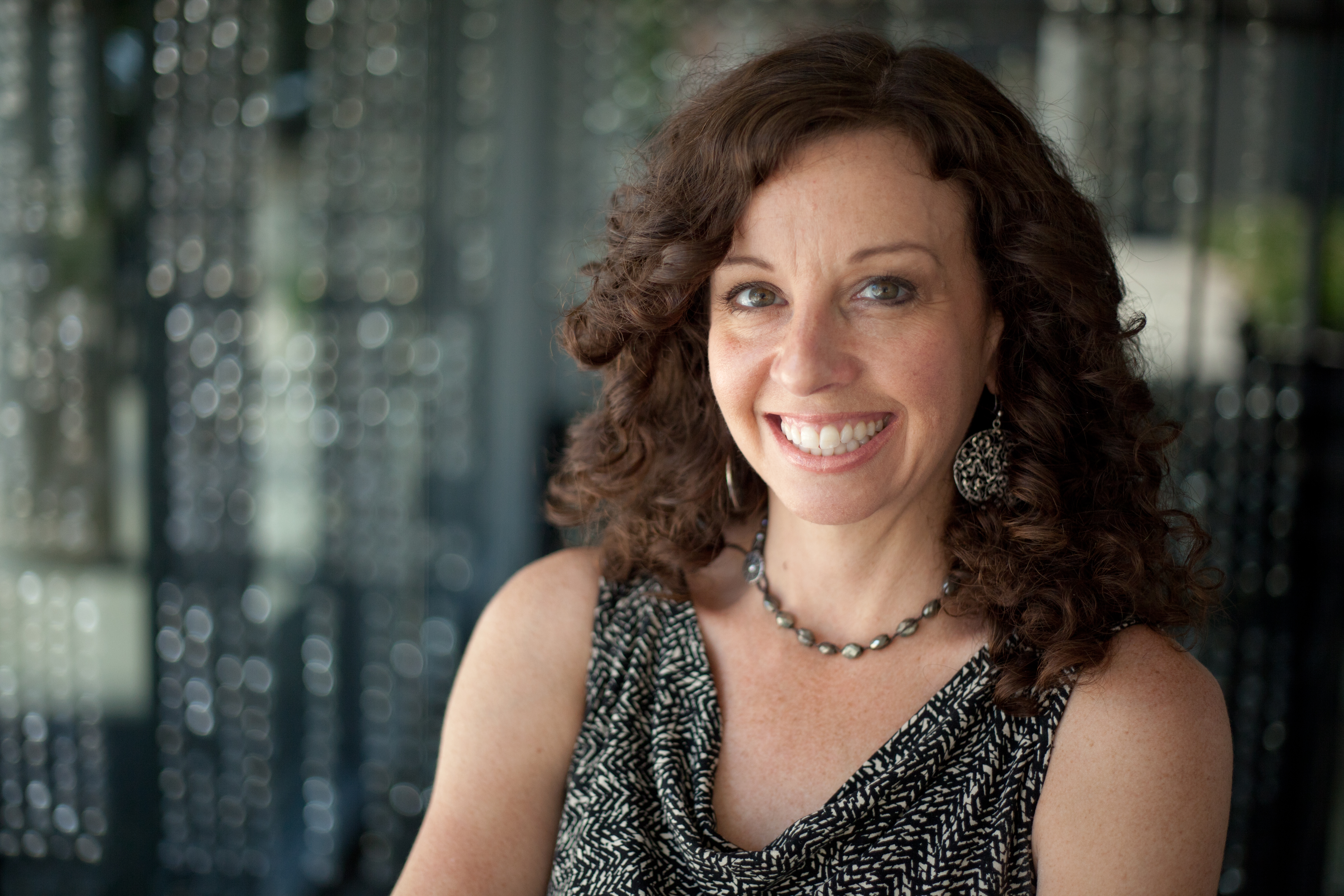
- Born: New York City, United States
- Known for: Directional Entropic Forces; Self-assembly; Patchy particles
- Awards: Member, National Academy of Engineering, National Academy of Science, American Academy of Arts and Sciences Fellow, American Physical Society (APS), American Association for the Advancement of Science (AAAS), American Institute of Chemical Engineers (AIChE), Materials Research Society (MRS) 2025 Peter Debye Award for Physical Chemistry, American Chemical Society 2025 Irving Langmuir Award for Chemical Physics, American Physical Society 2024 David Turnbull Lectureship Award, Materials Research Society 2024 FOMMS Medal, Foundations of Molecular Modeling and Simulation 2023 Clarivate Citation Laureate in Physics 2022 Vannevar Bush Faculty Fellow 2019 Nanoscale Science & Engineering Forum Award, AIChE 2019 Aneesur Rahman Prize in Computational Physics, American Physical Society 2019 Fred Kavli Distinguished Lectureship in Materials Science, Materials Research Society 2019 Alexander M. Cruickshank Lecturer, Liquids Gordon Research Conference 2017 Materials Communications Lecture Award, Materials Research Society 2014 MRS Medal, Materials Research Society 2016 Alpha Chi Sigma Award, AIChE 2012 Simons Investigator 2010 Charles M.E. Stine (now Braskem) Award, AIChE 2009 National Defense Science & Engineering Faculty Fellow (now VBFF) Maria Goeppart Mayer Award, American Physical Society Presidential Early Career Award for Scientists and Engineers (PECASE), NIST
- Scientific career
- Fields: Physics; Chemistry; Materials Science; Chemical Engineering
- Workplaces: University of Michigan; National Institute of Standards and Technology
- Doctoral advisor: H. Eugene Stanley

Sharon C. Glotzer is an American scientist and "digital alchemist", the John Werner Cahn Distinguished University Professor of Engineering and the Stuart W. Churchill Collegiate Professor of Chemical Engineering at the University of Michigan, where she is also professor of materials science and engineering, professor of physics, professor of macromolecular science and engineering, and professor of applied physics. From 2017-2025, she served as the Anthony C. Lembke Department Chair of Chemical Engineering at Michigan. She is recognized for her contributions to the fields of soft matter and computational science, most notably on problems in assembly science and engineering, nanoscience, and the glass transition, for which the elucidation of the nature of dynamical heterogeneity in glassy liquids is of particular significance. She is a member of the National Academy of Sciences, the National Academy of Engineering, and the American Academy of Arts and Sciences. In 2023 she was named a Clarivate Citation Laureate in Physics, joining a cohort of 23 world-class researchers who have made significant contributions across a diverse range of fields. Her scientific publications have been cited more than 40,000 times, and she has an h-index of 98 (Google Scholar 11/24/25).

== Education ==
Glotzer obtained her BSc in physics at the University of California, Los Angeles, in 1987, and her PhD in 1993 in theoretical soft condensed matter physics research under the guidance of H. Eugene Stanley at Boston University.

== Academic career ==
Sharon Glotzer joined the National Institute of Standards and Technology NIST in Gaithersburg, Maryland, in 1993 as a National Research Council postdoctoral fellow in the Polymers Division of the Materials Science & Engineering Laboratory. She became a permanent member of the Polymers Division, and was the co-founder, deputy director, and then director of the NIST Center for Theoretical and Computational Materials Science from 1994 to 2000. In January 2001 she moved to the University of Michigan as a tenured associate professor in Chemical Engineering and in Materials Science & Engineering. She is now the John Werner Cahn Distinguished University Professor of Engineering and the Stuart W. Churchill Collegiate Professor of Chemical Engineering. From 2017 to 2025 she served as the Anthony C. Lembke Department Chair of Chemical Engineering. Glotzer holds additional appointments in Materials Science and Engineering, Physics, Applied Physics, and Macromolecular Science and Engineering, and is a core member of the Biointerfaces Institute. She has served on numerous boards, including the Division of Physical Sciences Board and the Chemical Sciences and Technology Board of the National Academies of Sciences, Engineering, and Medicine. She served as associate editor of the leading nanoscience journal ACS Nano from 2014 to 2024, and is now an associate editor of JACS, the Journal of the American Chemical Society.

== Research and achievements ==
Glotzer made fundamental contributions to the field of the glass transition, for which the molecular dynamics simulation of Lennard-Jones particles exhibiting dynamical heterogeneity in the form of string-like motion in a 3D-liquid is of particular significance. In addition, her paper together with Michael J. Solomon on anisotropy dimensions of patchy particles has become a classic work, inspiring research directions of groups around the world. Glotzer and collaborators also hold the record for the densest tetrahedron packing and discovered that hard tetrahedrons can self-assemble into a dodecagonal quasicrystal.

Glotzer and collaborators coined the term ‘Directional Entropic Forces’ in 2011 to denote the effective interaction that drives anisotropic hard particles to align their facets during self-assembly and/or crystallization. This idea, which builds on Onsager's work on spherocylinders, allows for predictions of expected assembled crystal and crystal-like structures from attributes of the particles' shape.

Glotzer has served as PhD advisor to 85 graduate students, and mentored 30 postdoctoral and senior researchers in her group. She has published 343 peer-reviewed scientific papers. According to Google Scholar, her publications have received over 44,200 citations and her h-index is 98.

== Honors and awards ==
Glotzer was elected to the National Academy of Engineering in 2019 for the development of computer-based design principles for assembly engineering and manufacturing of advanced materials and nanotechnology. She was also elected a member of the National Academy of Sciences in 2014 and the American Academy of Arts and Sciences in 2011. She is a Fellow of the American Physical Society, the American Association for the Advancement of Science, the American Institute of Chemical Engineers, and the Materials Research Society. She is a member of the second inaugural class of Department of Defense National Security Science and Engineering (now Vannevar Bush) Faculty Fellows, and received the award again in 2022, and she was named a Simons Investigator in 2012, part of the inaugural class of Investigators. Like the MacArthur "Genius" Awardees, both Vannevar Bush Faculty Fellows and Simons Investigators receive significant funding to pursue unrestricted basic research. Glotzer is the recipient of numerous awards, including the Nanoscale Science & Engineering Forum Award, the Alpha Chi Sigma Award and the Charles M.A. Stine (now Braskem) Award, all from the American Institute of Chemical Engineers (AIChE); the Turnbull Lectureship Award and the MRS Medal, both from the Materials Research Society; the Irving Langmuir Award for Chemical Physics, the Aneesur Rahman Prize in Computational Physics and the Maria Goeppert-Mayer Award, all from the American Physical Society; the FOMMS Medal for Foundations in Molecular & Materials Simulation; a Presidential Early Career Award for Scientists and Engineers (PECASE); and a Department of Commerce Bronze Medal Award for Superior Federal Service. In 2014, she became an associate editor of ACS Nano., where she served until 2024. She is now Associate Editor of JACS.

== Articles ==
- P F Damasceno; M Engel; S C Glotzer (2012). "Predictive Self-Assembly of Polyhedra into Complex Structures". Science. 337 (6093): 453–457. Bibcode:2012Sci...337..453D. CiteSeerX 10.1.1.455.6962. doi:10.1126/science.1220869. PMID 22837525. S2CID 7177740.
- W Kob; C Donati; S J Plimpton; P H Poole; S C Glotzer (1997). "Dynamical Heterogeneities in a Supercooled Lennard-Jones Liquid". Physical Review Letters. 79 (15): 2827–2830. arXiv:cond-mat/9706075. Bibcode:1997PhRvL..79.2827K. doi:10.1103/PhysRevLett.79.2827. S2CID 14823693.
- C Donati; J F Douglas; W. Kob; S J Plimpton; P H Poole; S C Glotzer (1998). "Stringlike Cooperative Motion in a Supercooled Liquid". Physical Review Letters. 80 (15): 2338–2341. arXiv:cond-mat/9706075. Bibcode:1997PhRvL..79.2827K. doi:10.1103/PhysRevLett.79.2827. S2CID 14823693.
- S C Glotzer; M J Solomon (2007). "Anisotropy of Building Blocks and their Assembly into Complex Structures". Nature Materials. 6 (8): 557–562. Bibcode:2007NatMa...6..557G. doi:10.1038/nmat1949. PMID 17667968.
- P F Damasceno; M Engel; S C Glotzer (2012). "Crystalline Assemblies and Densest Packings of a Family of Truncated Tetrahedra and the Role of Directional Entropic Forces". ACS Nano. 6 (1): 609–614. arXiv:1109.1323. Bibcode:2012ACSNa...6..609D. doi:10.1021/nn204012y. PMID 22098586. S2CID 12785227.
- G van Anders; D Klotsa; A S Karas; P M Dodd; S C Glotzer (2015). "Digital Alchemy for Materials Design: Colloids and Beyond". ACS Nano. 9 (10): 9542–9553. arXiv:1507.04960. Bibcode:2015ACSNa...9.9542V. doi:10.1021/acsnano.5b04181. PMID 26401754. S2CID 6684647.
