= Amorphous solid =

Non-crystalline solid

In condensed matter physics and materials science, an amorphous solid (from Ancient Greek ᾰ̓ (a) 'without' and μορφή (morphḗ) 'shape, form'), or non-crystalline solid, is a solid that lacks the long-range order that is a characteristic of a crystal. The terms "glass" and "glassy solid" are sometimes used synonymously with amorphous solid; however, these terms refer specifically to amorphous materials that undergo a glass transition. Examples of amorphous solids include glasses, metallic glasses, and certain types of plastics and polymers.

== Structure ==
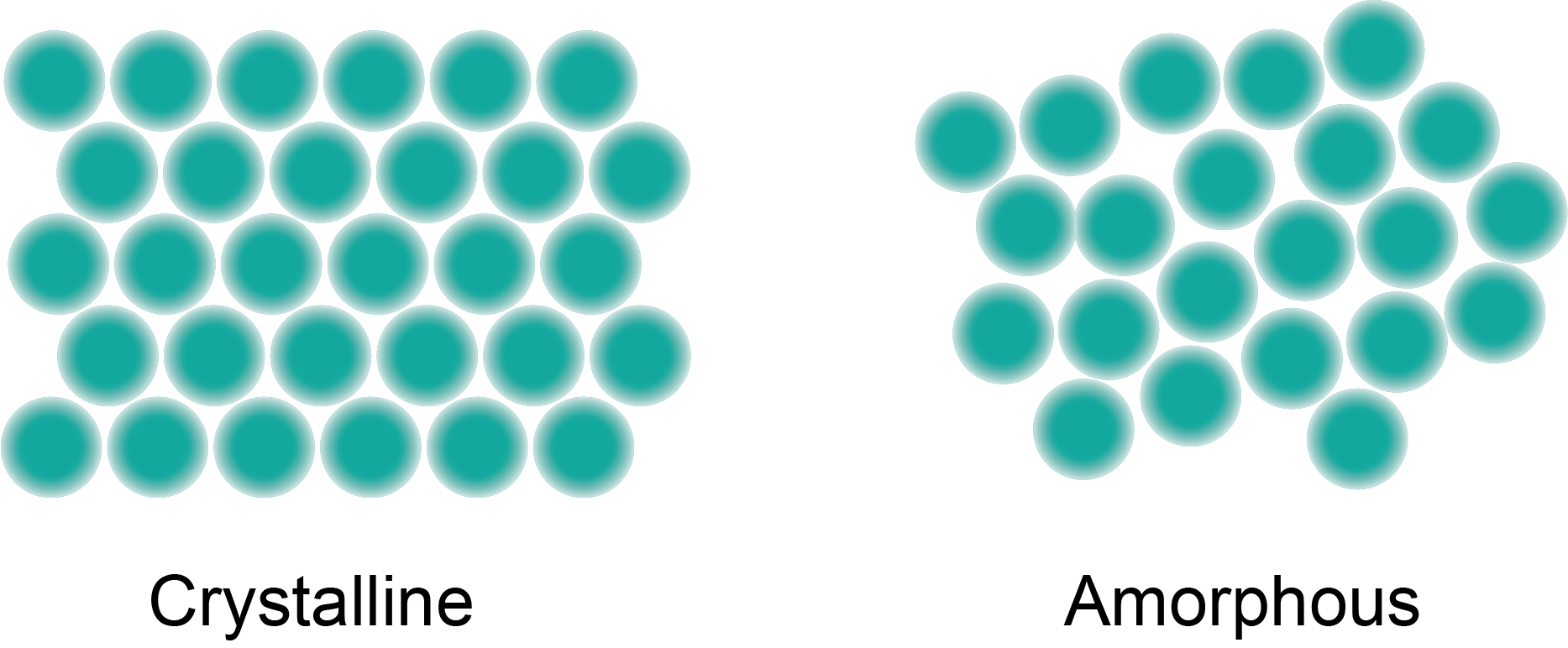
Crystalline vs. amorphous solid

Amorphous materials have an internal structure of molecular-scale structural blocks that can be similar to the basic structural units in the crystalline phase of the same compound. Unlike in crystalline materials, however, no long-range regularity exists: amorphous materials cannot be described by the repetition of a finite unit cell. Statistical measures, such as the atomic density function and radial distribution function, are more useful in describing the structure of amorphous solids.

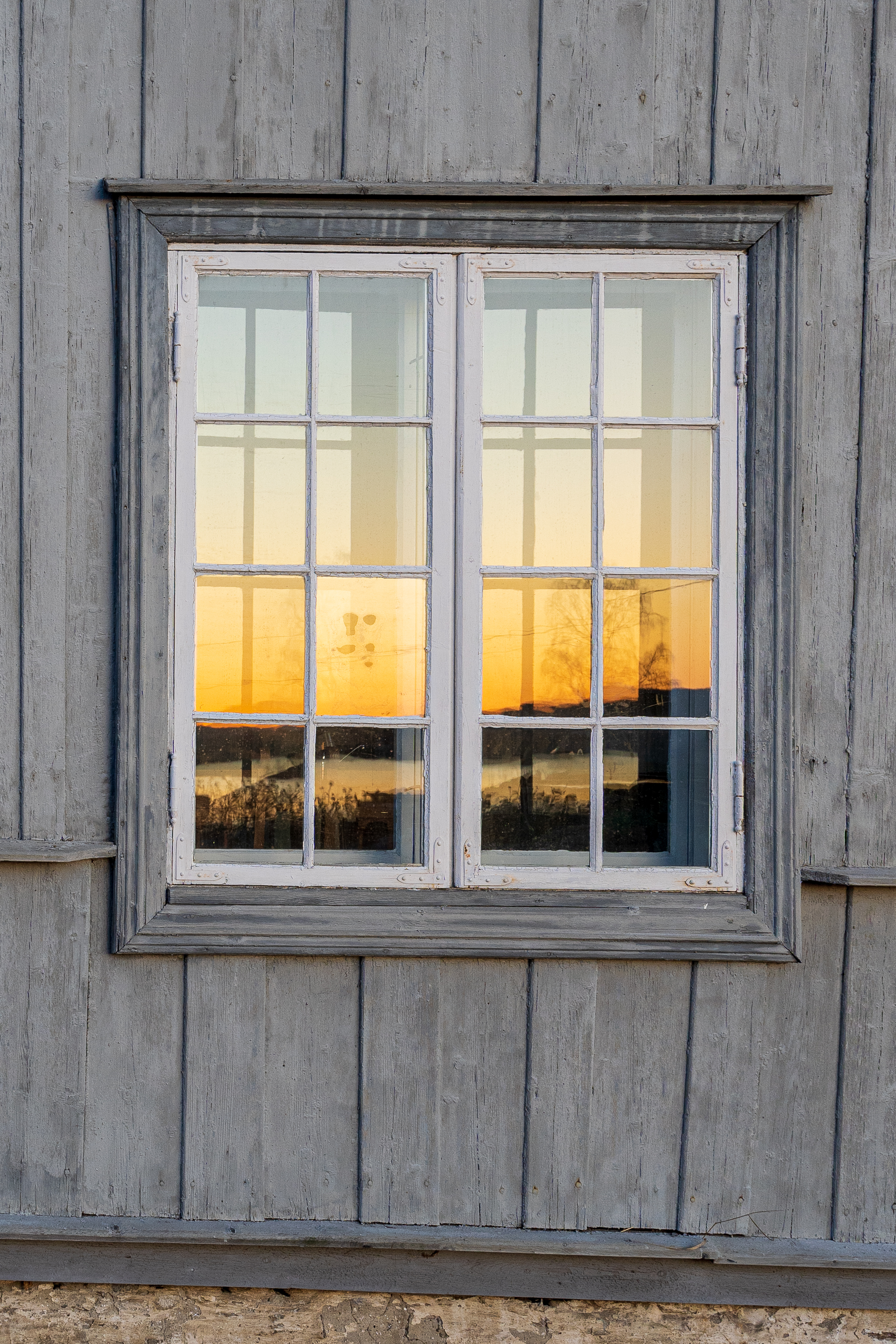
Glass is a commonly encountered example of amorphous solids.

Although amorphous materials lack long range order, they exhibit localized order on small length scales. By convention, short range order extends only to the nearest neighbor shell, typically only 1-2 atomic spacings. Medium range order may extend beyond the short range order by 1-2 nm.

== Fundamental properties of amorphous solids ==
=== Glass transition at high temperatures ===
The freezing from liquid state to amorphous solid — glass transition — is considered one of the very important and unsolved problems of physics.

=== Universal low-temperature properties of amorphous solids ===
At very low temperatures (below 1-10 K), a large family of amorphous solids have various similar low-temperature properties. Although there are various theoretical models, neither glass transition nor low-temperature properties of glassy solids are well understood on the fundamental physics level.

Amorphous solids is an important area of condensed matter physics aiming to understand these substances at high temperatures of glass transition and at low temperatures towards absolute zero. From the 1970s, low-temperature properties of amorphous solids were studied experimentally in great detail. For all of these substances, specific heat has a (nearly) linear dependence as a function of temperature, and thermal conductivity has nearly quadratic temperature dependence. These properties are conventionally called anomalous being very different from properties of crystalline solids.

On the phenomenological level, many of these properties were described by a collection of tunnelling two-level systems. Nevertheless, the microscopic theory of these properties is still missing after more than 50 years of the research.

Remarkably, a dimensionless quantity of internal friction is nearly universal in these materials. This quantity is a dimensionless ratio (up to a numerical constant) of the phonon wavelength to the phonon mean free path. Since the theory of tunnelling two-level states (TLSs) does not address the origin of the density of TLSs, this theory cannot explain the universality of internal friction, which in turn is proportional to the density of scattering TLSs. The theoretical significance of this important and unsolved problem was highlighted by Anthony Leggett.

== Nano-structured materials ==
Amorphous materials will have some degree of short-range order at the atomic-length scale due to the nature of intermolecular chemical bonding. (Note: See the structure of liquids and glasses for more information on non-crystalline material structure.) Furthermore, in very small crystals, short-range order encompasses a large fraction of the atoms; nevertheless, relaxation at the surface, along with interfacial effects, distorts the atomic positions and decreases structural order. Even the most advanced structural characterization techniques, such as X-ray diffraction and transmission electron microscopy, can have difficulty distinguishing amorphous and crystalline structures at short-size scales.

== Characterization of amorphous solids ==
Due to the lack of long-range order, standard crystallographic techniques are often inadequate in determining the structure of amorphous solids. A variety of electron, X-ray, and computation-based techniques have been used to characterize amorphous materials. Multi-modal analysis is very common for amorphous materials.

=== X-ray and neutron diffraction ===
Unlike crystalline materials, which exhibit strong Bragg diffraction, the diffraction patterns of amorphous materials are characterized by broad and diffuse peaks. As a result, detailed analysis and complementary techniques are required to extract real space structural information from the diffraction patterns of amorphous materials. It is useful to obtain diffraction data from both X-ray and neutron sources as they have different scattering properties and provide complementary data. Pair distribution function analysis can be performed on diffraction data to determine the probability of finding a pair of atoms separated by a certain distance. Another type of analysis that is done with diffraction data of amorphous materials is radial distribution function analysis, which measures the number of atoms found at varying radial distances away from an arbitrary reference atom. From these techniques, the local order of an amorphous material can be elucidated.

=== X-ray absorption fine-structure spectroscopy ===
X-ray absorption fine-structure spectroscopy is an atomic scale probe making it useful for studying materials lacking in long-range order. Spectra obtained using this method provide information on the oxidation state, coordination number, and species surrounding the atom in question as well as the distances at which they are found.

=== Atomic electron tomography ===
The atomic electron tomography technique is performed in transmission electron microscopes capable of reaching sub-Angstrom resolution. A collection of 2D images taken at numerous different tilt angles is acquired from the sample in question and then used to reconstruct a 3D image. After image acquisition, a significant amount of processing must be done to correct for issues such as drift, noise, and scan distortion. High-quality analysis and processing using atomic electron tomography results in a 3D reconstruction of an amorphous material detailing the atomic positions of the different species that are present.

=== Fluctuation electron microscopy ===
Fluctuation electron microscopy is another transmission electron microscopy-based technique that is sensitive to the medium-range order of amorphous materials. Structural fluctuations arising from different forms of medium-range order can be detected with this method. Fluctuation electron microscopy experiments can be done in conventional or scanning transmission electron microscope mode.

=== Computational techniques ===
Simulation and modeling techniques are often combined with experimental methods to characterize structures of amorphous materials. Commonly used computational techniques include density functional theory, molecular dynamics, and reverse Monte Carlo.

== Uses and observations ==
=== Amorphous thin films ===
Amorphous phases are important constituents of thin films. Thin films are solid layers of a few nanometres to tens of micrometres thickness that are deposited onto a substrate. So-called structure zone models were developed to describe the microstructure of thin films as a function of the homologous temperature (T_{h}), which is the ratio of deposition temperature to melting temperature. According to these models, a necessary condition for the occurrence of amorphous phases is that (T_{h}) has to be smaller than 0.3. The deposition temperature must be below 30% of the melting temperature. (Note: For higher values, the surface diffusion of deposited atomic species would allow for the formation of crystallites with long-range atomic order.)

=== Superconductivity ===
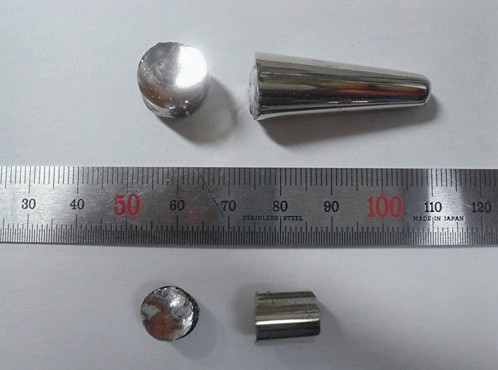
Amorphous metals have low toughness, but high strength

Regarding their applications, amorphous metallic layers played an important role in the discovery of superconductivity in amorphous metals made by Buckel and Hilsch. The superconductivity of amorphous metals, including amorphous metallic thin films, is now understood to be due to phonon-mediated Cooper pairing. The role of structural disorder can be rationalized based on the strong-coupling Eliashberg theory of superconductivity.

=== Thermal protection ===
Amorphous solids typically exhibit higher localization of heat carriers compared to crystalline, giving rise to low thermal conductivity. Products for thermal protection, such as thermal barrier coatings and insulation, rely on materials with ultralow thermal conductivity.

=== Technological uses ===
Today, optical coatings made from TiO_{2}, SiO_{2}, Ta_{2}O_{5} etc. (and combinations of these) in most cases consist of amorphous phases of these compounds. Much research is carried out into thin amorphous films as a gas-separating membrane layer. The technologically most important thin amorphous film is probably represented by a few nm thin SiO_{2} layers serving as isolator above the conducting channel of a metal-oxide semiconductor field-effect transistor (MOSFET). Also, hydrogenated amorphous silicon (Si:H) is of technical significance for thin-film solar cells. (Note: In the case of hydrogenated amorphous silicon, the missing long-range order between silicon atoms is partly induced by the presence of hydrogen in the per cent range.)

=== Pharmaceutical use ===
In the pharmaceutical industry, some amorphous drugs have been shown to offer higher bioavailability than their crystalline counterparts as a result of the higher solubility of the amorphous phase. However, certain compounds can undergo precipitation in their amorphous form in vivo and can then decrease mutual bioavailability if administered together. Studies of GDC-0810 ASDs show a strong interrelationship between microstructure, physical properties and dissolution performance.

=== In soils ===
Amorphous materials in soil strongly influence bulk density, aggregate stability, plasticity, and water holding capacity of soils. The low bulk density and high void ratios are mostly due to glass shards and other porous minerals not becoming compacted. Andisol soils contain the highest amounts of amorphous materials.

== Phase ==
Amorphous phases were a phenomenon of particular interest for the study of thin-film growth. The growth of polycrystalline films is often used and preceded by an initial amorphous layer, the thickness of which may amount to only a few nm. The most investigated example is represented by the unoriented molecules of thin polycrystalline silicon films. (Note: An initial amorphous layer was observed in many studies of thin polycrystalline silicon films.) Wedge-shaped polycrystals were identified by transmission electron microscopy to grow out of the amorphous phase only after the latter has exceeded a certain thickness, the precise value of which depends on deposition temperature, background pressure, and various other process parameters. The phenomenon has been interpreted in the framework of Ostwald's rule of stages that predicts the formation of phases to proceed with increasing condensation time towards increasing stability. (Note: Experimental studies of the phenomenon require a clearly defined state of the substrate surface—and its contaminant density, etc.—upon which the thin film is deposited.)
