= Fragility (glass physics) =

Property of glass forming liquids

The glass transition temperature T_{g}-scaled Arrhenius plot of fragility of glass forming liquids indicate the distinct behavior of strong and fragile liquids. This representation of fragility is known as an "Angell Plot".

In glass sciences, fragility or kinetic fragility is a concept proposed by the Australian-American physical chemist C. Austen Angell. Fragility characterizes how rapidly the viscosity of a glass forming liquid approaches a very large value approximately 10^{12} Pa s during cooling. At this viscosity, the liquid is "frozen" into a solid and the corresponding temperature is known as the glass transition temperature T_{g}. Materials with a higher fragility have a more rapid increase in viscosity as approaching Tg, while those with a lower fragility have a slower increase in viscosity. Fragility is one of the most important concepts to understand viscous liquids and glasses. Fragility may be related to the presence of dynamical heterogeneity in glass forming liquids, as well as to the breakdown of the usual Stokes–Einstein relationship between viscosity and diffusion. Fragility has no direct relationship with the colloquial meaning of the word "fragility", which more closely relates to the brittleness of a material.

== Definition ==
Formally, fragility reflects the degree to which the temperature dependence of the viscosity (or relaxation time) deviates from Arrhenius behavior. This classification was originally proposed by Austen Angell. The most common definition of fragility is the "kinetic fragility index" m, which characterizes the slope of the viscosity (or relaxation time) of a material with temperature as it approaches the glass transition temperature from above:

${m}:=\left( {\partial{\log_{10} \eta }\over\partial \left (T_g/T \right)} \right) _{T=Tg} =\frac{1}{\ln 10}\left( {\partial{\ln\eta }\over\partial \left (T_g/T \right)} \right) _{T=Tg} =\frac{T_g}{\ln 10}\left( {-\partial{\ln\eta }\over\partial T} \right) _{T=Tg}$

where $\eta$ is viscosity, T_{g} is the glass transition temperature, m is fragility, and T is temperature. Glass-formers with a high fragility are called "fragile"; those with a low fragility are called "strong". For example, silica has a relatively low fragility and is called "strong", whereas some polymers have relatively high fragility and are called "fragile".

Several fragility parameters have been introduced to characterise the fragility of liquids, including the Bruning–Sutton, Avramov and Doremus fragility parameters. The Bruning–Sutton fragility parameter m relies on the curvature or slope of the viscosity curves. The Avramov fragility parameter α is based on a Kohlraush-type formula of viscosity derived for glasses: strong liquids have α ≈ 1 whereas liquids with higher α values become more fragile. Doremus indicated that practically all melts deviate from the Arrhenius behaviour, e.g. the activation energy of viscosity changes from a high Q_{H} at low temperature to a low Q_{L} at high temperature. However asymptotically both at low and high temperatures the activation energy of viscosity becomes constant, e.g. independent of temperature. Changes that occur in the activation energy are unambiguously characterised by the ratio between the two values of activation energy at low and high temperatures, which Doremus suggested could be used as a fragility criterion: R_{D}=Q_{H}/Q_{L}. The higher R_{D}, the more fragile are the liquids, Doremus' fragility ratios range from 1.33 for germania to 7.26 for diopside melts.

The Doremus' criterion of fragility can be expressed in terms of thermodynamic parameters of the defects mediating viscous flow in the oxide melts: R_{D}=1+H_{d}/H_{m}, where H_{d} is the enthalpy of formation and H_{m} is the enthalpy of motion of such defects. Hence the fragility of oxide melts is an intrinsic thermodynamic parameter of melts which can be determined unambiguously by experiment.

The fragility can also be expressed analytically in terms of physical parameters that are related to the interatomic or intermolecular interaction potential. It is given as function of a parameter which measures the steepness of the interatomic or intermolecular repulsion, and as a function of the thermal expansion coefficient of the liquid, which, instead, is related to the attractive part of the interatomic or intermolecular potential. The analysis of various systems (from Lennard-Jones model liquids to metal alloys) has evidenced that a steeper interatomic repulsion leads to more fragile liquids, or, conversely, that soft atoms make strong liquids.

Recent synchrotron radiation X-ray diffraction experiments showed a clear link between structure evolution of the supercooled liquid on cooling, for example, intensification of Ni-P and Cu-P peaks in the radial distribution function close to the glass-transition, and liquid fragility.

== Physical implications ==
The physical origin of the non-Arrhenius behavior of fragile glass formers is an area of active investigation in glass physics. Advances over the last decade have linked this phenomenon with the presence of locally heterogeneous dynamics in fragile glass formers; i.e. the presence of distinct (if transient) slow and fast regions within the material. This effect has also been connected to the breakdown of the Stokes–Einstein relation between diffusion and viscosity in fragile liquids.
