= Judith Herzfeld =

American chemist

Judith Herzfeld (born 1948) is a Professor Emerita at Brandeis University. She is the author of two mainstream books, and author or coauthor of more than 200 scientific papers. Her scholarly work has been primarily in the area of biophysical chemistry (i.e., investigating the chemical/molecular basis of biological phenomena, using methods from physics).

== Research contributions ==
Although trained as a theoretician, Herzfeld's interest in molecular biophysics led her to also establish an experimental program.

For the first two decades, Herzfeld's theoretical program focused on the use of statistical thermodynamics to understand the spontaneous spatial ordering of self-assembled protein filaments in the crowded interiors of cells and its implications for the morphology and rheology of cells in health and in disease (e.g., sickle-cell disease). Subsequently, her theoretical program focused on a semi-classical treatment of electrons in molecules to efficiently describe molecular polarizability, the unpairing of Linnett quartets, and reaction mechanisms in condensed phases.

Herzfeld's experimental program applied solid state NMR spectroscopy to problems that are intractable by other structural methods. A long-term study focused on the mechanism by which the membrane protein bacteriorhodopsin enforces vectorial ion transfers that convert light energy to electrochemical form. A shorter study on the flotation organelles of aquatic micro-organisms revealed that an amyloid pattern of protein assembly underlies the strength and interfacial stability of these vesicles. Other studies in the Herzfeld lab have elucidated the structures of amorphous organic polymers that form spontaneously under prebiotic conditions. In the course of solving some of the practical problems involved in this work, the Herzfeld lab also developed some methods that have been adopted by other spectroscopists. This includes analysis of spinning sidebands to extract local anisotropy information, and spectroscopy by the integration of frequency and time domain information (SIFT) to carryout rapid, model-free processing of non-uniformly sampled spin evolution.

Recognition of Herzfeld's scholarship includes fellowship in the American Physical Society, the American Association for the Advancement of Science, and the Massachusetts Academy of Sciences.

== Contributions to chemical education ==
To thoroughly implement active learning in large chemistry classes, Herzfeld adopted the Peer Instruction method pioneered by Eric Mazur and developed a large, widely used set of ConcepTests that thoroughly covers the content of general chemistry. In further pursuit of active learning, she also designed some games to play through complex chemical scenarios and some drawing exercises that assist in visualizing the variables underlying chemical behavior.

For a more engaging reading of general chemistry, Herzfeld reorganized a conventional textbook around a chronological account of our material world, covering topics from the formation of elements and molecules through planetary chemistry, the chemistry of living systems, and industrial-era changes to the environment.

For upper-level students Herzfeld has prepared a primer on thermodynamics, a subject that newcomers often find baffling. In concise fashion, "The Necessity of Entropy: the Marcroscopic Argument, the Microscopic Response and Some Practical Consequences" (https://doi.org/10.48617/1029) lays out the foundational logic of classical and statistical thermodynamics uninterrupted by the elaborations normally encountered in textbooks. The expectation is that the rich connections of thermodynamics will be easier to appreciate and assimilate with a simple and sturdy scaffold to build on.

== Books for the general reader ==
During her decade at Harvard Medical School, Herzfeld wrote "Sense & Sensibility in Childbirth: A Guide to Supportive Obstetrical Care" (1985), seeking to help women identify, secure and navigate optimal maternity care. More recently, her interdisciplinary teaching at Brandeis University motivated "Choice, Compulsion, Consequences ... Doubting Free Will & Embracing Determinism" (2026). The book addresses the implications of determinism for enforcing social order, enjoying meaning in life, and securing a healthy polity.

== Biography ==
The first born of young German-Jewish refugees, Herzfeld received her primary and secondary education in New York City public schools, supplemented by the resources of the city's public libraries, parks and museums, and by the Girl Scouts of the USA. She first became attracted to the sciences in an accelerated and enriched junior high school program mounted by the city in response to Sputnik, began research during her last summer in high school (with Murray Goodman at the then Brooklyn Polytechnic Institute), and won the First Army Prize at the National Science Fair during her senior year.

She received her university education at Barnard College of Columbia University (bachelor's in chemistry 1967, advisor Bernice Segal), MIT (doctorate in chemical physics 1972, departmental advisor Robert J. Silbey, thesis advisor H. Eugene Stanley) and the Kennedy School of Government at Harvard University (master's in public policy 1973). She began her independent work as a tenure track assistant professor of chemistry at Amherst College in 1973, the first woman appointed to the faculty in the natural sciences at the then still all-male college. A year later she resigned to marry MIT scientist Robert Griffin.

Moving back to Boston, she took a position at Harvard Medical School, first as a member of the Biophysical Laboratory (led by Arthur K. Solomon) and then as a member of the Department of Physiology and Biophysics. There she represented her colleagues on the Faculty Council, served on the Faculty Docket Committee, and chaired the Joint Committee on the Status of Women of the Harvard Schools of Medicine, Dental Medicine and Public Health. Her two daughters were born during those years. In 1985 she moved to the Department of Chemistry at Brandeis University where her service included two terms as a faculty senator, one term as the department chair (the first woman in that role in the physical sciences), and four terms as a faculty representative to the board of trustees.
