= Liquid–liquid critical point =

A liquid–liquid critical point (or LLCP) is the endpoint of a liquid–liquid phase transition line (LLPT); it is a critical point where two types of local structures coexist at the exact ratio of unity. This hypothesis was first developed by Peter Poole, Francesco Sciortino, Uli Essmann and H. Eugene Stanley in Boston to obtain a quantitative understanding of the huge number of anomalies present in water.

Near a liquid–liquid critical point, there is always a competition between two alternative local structures. For instance, in supercooled water, two types of local structures have been predicted: a low-density local configuration (LD) and a high-density local configuration (HD), so above the critical pressure, the liquid is composed by a majority of HD local structure, while below the critical pressure a higher fraction of LD local configurations is present. The ratio between HD and LD configurations is determined according to the thermodynamic equilibrium of the system, which is often governed by external variables such as pressure and temperature.

The liquid–liquid critical point theory can be applied to several liquids that possess the tetrahedral symmetry. The study of liquid–liquid critical points is an active research area with hundreds of articles having been published, though only a few of these investigations have been experimental since most modern probing techniques are not fast and/or sensitive enough to study them.
