= Triphenyl phosphite =

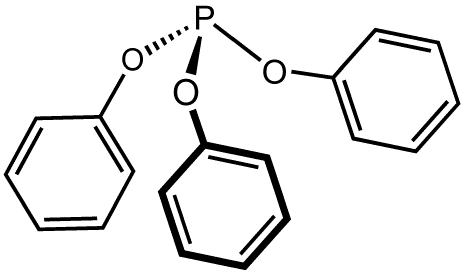

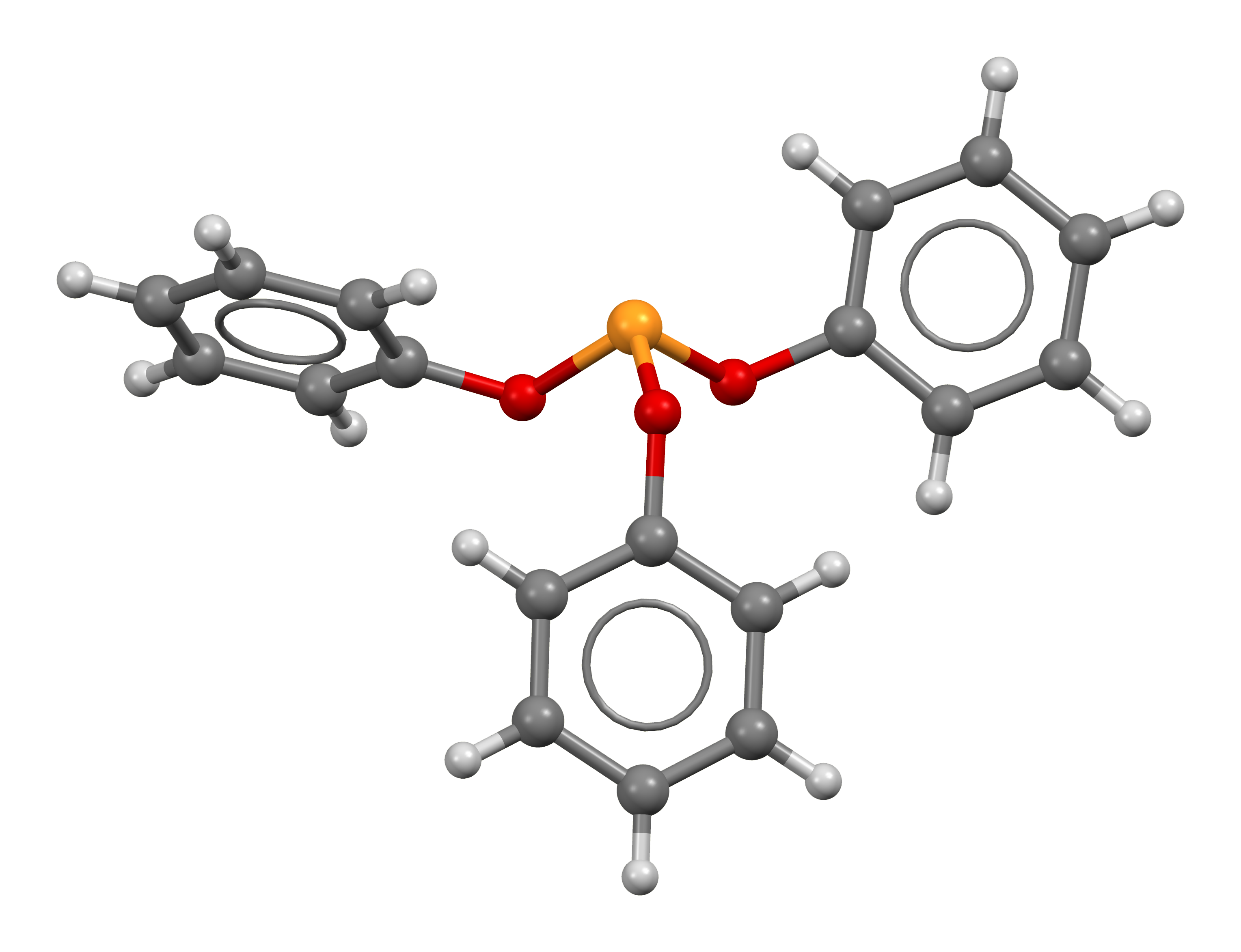

Names
- Preferred IUPAC name Triphenyl phosphite

Identifiers
CAS Number	101-02-0
3D model (JSmol)	Interactive image
ChemSpider	7259
ECHA InfoCard	100.002.645
PubChem CID	7540
UNII	9P45GRD24X
CompTox Dashboard (EPA)	DTXSID0026252
- InChI: InChI=1S/C18H15O3P/c1-4-10-16(11-5-1)19-22(20-17-12-6-2-7-13-17)21-18-14-8-3-9-15-18/h1-15H Key: HVLLSGMXQDNUAL-UHFFFAOYSA-N; InChI=1/C18H15O3P/c1-4-10-16(11-5-1)19-22(20-17-12-6-2-7-13-17)21-18-14-8-3-9-15-18/h1-15H Key: HVLLSGMXQDNUAL-UHFFFAOYAF
- SMILES: O(P(Oc1ccccc1)Oc2ccccc2)c3ccccc3

Properties
Chemical formula	C_{18}H_{15}O_{3}P
Molar mass	310.28 g/mol
Appearance	colourless liquid
Density	1.184 g/mL
Melting point	22 to 24 °C (72 to 75 °F; 295 to 297 K)
Boiling point	360 °C (680 °F; 633 K)
Solubility in water	low
Solubility	organic solvents
Magnetic susceptibility (χ)	−183.7·10^{−6} cm^{3}/mol

Hazards
- Occupational safety and health (OHS/OSH)
Main hazards	flammable
- Except where otherwise noted, data are given for materials in their standard state (at 25 °C [77 °F], 100 kPa). verify (what is ?) Infobox references

Triphenyl phosphite is the organophosphorus compound with the formula P(OC_{6}H_{5})_{3}. It is a colourless viscous liquid.

== Preparation ==
Triphenylphosphite is prepared from phosphorus trichloride and phenol in the presence of a catalytic amount of base:

PCl_{3} + 3 HOC_{6}H_{5} → P(OC_{6}H_{5})_{3} + 3 HCl

== Reactions ==
Triphenylphosphite is a precursor to trimethylphosphine, it serves as a source of P^{3+} that is less electrophilic than phosphorus trichloride:

(C_{6}H_{5}O)_{3}P + 3 CH_{3}MgBr → P(CH_{3})_{3} + 3 "MgBrOC_{6}H_{5}"

Triphenylphosphite is quaternized by methyl iodide:

(C_{6}H_{5}O)_{3}P + CH_{3}I → [CH_{3}(C_{6}H_{5}O)_{3}P]^{+}I^{−}

=== Coordination complexes ===
Triphenylphosphite is a common ligand in coordination chemistry. It forms zero-valent complexes of the type M[P(OC_{6}H_{5})_{3}]_{4} (M = Ni, Pd, Pt). The nickel complex can be prepared by displacement of the diene from bis(cyclooctadiene)nickel:

Ni(COD)_{2} + 4 P(OC_{6}H_{5})_{3} → Ni[P(OC_{6}H_{5})_{3}]_{4} + 2 COD

Related complexes are homogeneous catalysts for the hydrocyanation of alkenes. It also forms a variety of Fe(0) and Fe(II) complexes such as the dihydride H_{2}Fe[P(OC_{6}H_{5})_{3}]_{4}.

== Polyamorphism ==
Triphenylphosphite is a notable example of polyamorphism in organic compounds, namely it exists in two different amorphous forms at temperatures about 200 K. One polymorphic modification of triphenyl phosphite was obtained by means of crystallization in ionic liquids.
