= H. Eugene Stanley =

American physicist

Harry Eugene Stanley
- Born: March 28, 1941 (age 85); Oklahoma City, Oklahoma
- Citizenship: USA
- Education: Wesleyan University (B.A., 1962); Harvard University (Ph.D., 1967)
- Known for: Econophysics; Statistical physics Complex networks
- Awards: Choice Award for Outstanding Academic Book (1971) Floyd K. Richtmyer Prize (1997); David Turnbull Prize (1998); Distinguished Teacher–Scholar Prize (2001); Memory Ride Prize for Alzheimer Research (2001); Dwight Nicholson Medal (2003); Teresiana Medal (2004); Boltzmann Medal (2004); Zenith Fellow Award of the Alzheimer Association (2005); Julius Edgar Lilienfeld Prize (2008); Senior Award, European Complex Systems Society (2014) Massachusetts Professor of the Year
- Scientific career
- Fields: Statistical physics
- Workplaces: Boston University; MIT; University of California, Berkeley; Harvard University
- Thesis: Critical phenomena in Heisenberg models of magnetism (1967)
- Doctoral advisor: T. A. Kaplan; J. H. Van Vleck
- Doctoral students: Albert-László Barabási; Alex Hankey; Sharon Glotzer; Judith Herzfeld; Sidney Redner; Luis Amaral; Nikolay Dokholyan; Srikanth Sastry; Robin Selinger

Harry Eugene Stanley (born March 28, 1941) is an American physicist and University Professor at Boston University. He has made seminal contributions to statistical physics and is one of the pioneers of interdisciplinary science. His current research focuses on understanding the anomalous behavior of liquid water, but he had made fundamental contributions to complex systems, such as quantifying correlations among the constituents of the Alzheimer brain, and quantifying fluctuations in noncoding and coding DNA sequences, interbeat intervals of the healthy and diseased heart. He is one of the founding fathers of econophysics.

== Education ==
Stanley obtained his B.A. in physics at Wesleyan University in 1962.

He performed biological physics research with Max Delbrück in 1963 and was awarded a Ph.D. in physics from Harvard University in 1967.

Stanley was a Miller Fellow at University of California, Berkeley with Charles Kittel, where he wrote an Oxford monograph Introduction to Phase Transitions and Critical Phenomena which won the Choice Award for Outstanding Academic Book of 1971.

== Academic career ==
Stanley was appointed Assistant Professor of Physics at MIT in 1969 and was promoted to Associate Professor in 1971. He was appointed Hermann von Helmholtz Associate Professor in 1973, in recognition of his interdepartmental teaching and research with the Harvard-MIT Program in Health Sciences and Technology. In 1976, Stanley joined Boston University as Professor of Physics, and Associate Professor of Physiology (in the School of Medicine). In 1978 and 1979, he was promoted to Professor of Physiology and University Professor, respectively. Since 2007 he holds joint appointments with the Chemistry and Biomedical Engineering Departments. In 2011, he was made William F. Warren Distinguished Professor. In the spring of 2013, he held the Lorentz Professorship at the University of Leiden.

== Research and achievements ==
Stanley had fundamental contributions to several topics in statistical physics, such as the theory of phase transitions, percolation, disordered systems, aggregation phenomena, polymers, econophysics and biological physics. His early work introduced the n-vector model of magnetism and its exact solution in the limit nà infinity, topics that are now part of standard statistical physics textbooks.

His seminal work on liquid water started with a percolation model he developed in 1980 with José Teixeira to explain the experimentally observed anticorrelations in entropy and volume. In 1992 he developed the liquid-liquid critical point hypothesis, that offered a quantitative understanding of water’s anomalies, applying to all liquids with tetrahedral symmetry (such as silicon and silica). Direct experimental proof for his proposal was obtained by recent experiments in Tsukuba, MIT, and Stanford.

Stanley introduced the term ‘econophysics’ in 1994 to describe the interdisciplinary field merging physics principles with economic phenomena. His research group has identified empirical laws governing economic fluctuations and developed statistical mechanics models to elucidate their underlying mechanisms.

The ISI Web of Science, lists 76,778 citations to Stanley's work (excluding 33 books). Using the Hirsch H Index metric for publication impact [PNAS 102, 16569 (2005)], Stanley has authored 129 papers with a citation count equal to or greater than 129, so H = 129. Google Scholar lists over 200,000 citations, with H = 201.

Stanley is committed to education at all levels, from high school to graduate studies. He has served as thesis advisor to 114 Ph.D. students and has collaborated with 211 postdoctoral fellows and visiting faculty. He is also active in worldwide efforts for achieving gender balance in the physical sciences.

== Honors and awards ==
Stanley has been elected to the U.S. National Academy of Sciences (2004), the Brazilian Academy of Sciences. He is an Honorary Member of the Hungarian Physical Society. He is currently Honorary Professor at the Institute for Advanced Studies, University of Pavia (Pavia, Italy), and at Eötvös Loránd University (Budapest, Hungary). Stanley awarded the 2004 APS Nicholson Medal for Humanitarian Service, "For his extraordinary contributions to human rights, for his initiatives on behalf of female physicists, and for his caring and supportive relationship with those who have worked in his laboratory."

For his contributions to phase transitions Stanley received the 2004 Boltzmann Medal, awarded by International Union of Pure and Applied Physics (IUPAP), and the American Physical Society 2008 Julius Edgar Lilienfeld Prize.

He was awarded the Teresiana Medal in Complex Systems Research given by the University of Pavia. He also received the Distinguished Teaching Scholar Director's Award from the National Science Foundation, the Nicholson Medal for Human Outreach from the American Physical Society, a Guggenheim Fellowship (1979), the David Turnbull Prize from the Materials Research Society (1998), a BP Venture Research Award, the Floyd K. Richtmyer Memorial Lectureship Award (1997), the Memory Ride Award for Alzheimer Research, and the Massachusetts Professor of the Year awarded by the Council for Advancement and Support of Education.

Stanley has received nine Doctorates Honoris Causa, from Bar-Ilan University Ramat Gan, (Israel), Eötvös Loránd University (Budapest). University of Liège (Belgium), University of Dortmund, University of Wroclaw, Northwestern University, University of Messina, University of Leicester, and the IMT Institute for Advanced Studies Lucca.

== See also ==
- List of members of the National Academy of Sciences (Applied physical sciences)
