= Robin Selinger =

American materials scientist

- Born: Robin Lillian Blumberg; Arlington, Texas, United States
- Occupation: Professor of physics at Kent State University
- Spouse: Jonathan Selinger (m. 1985)
- Children: 2

Academic background
- Education: AB, Physics, 1984, Harvard–Radcliffe College; AM, Physics, 1986, PhD, 1989, Harvard University
- Thesis: Physics of disordered media: aggregation and diffusion (1989)
- Doctoral advisor: Bertrand Halperin; H. Eugene Stanley

Academic work
- Institutions: Liquid Crystal Institute; Kent State University; Catholic University of America

Robin Lillian Blumberg Selinger (née Blumberg) is an American materials scientist. She is professor of physics at Kent State University and the Advanced Materials and Liquid Crystal Institute. In 2016, Selinger became the first female Kent State University faculty member to be elected a Fellow of the American Physical Society.

== Early life and education ==
Robin Lillian Blumberg was born to parents Elliott and Louise Blumberg in Arlington, Texas, United States. Growing up, her family attended Congregation Beth-El (Fort Worth) where she was one of the first girls to celebrate a bat mitzvah. As a high school student at Fort Worth Country Day School, Selinger received a four-year corporate-sponsored National Merit scholarship after scoring high on standardized tests. Following high school, Selinger enrolled at Harvard-Radcliffe College for her undergraduate degree in Physics. She remained at Harvard University for her graduate degrees in the same field. While completing her studies, Selinger received the Zonta International Club's Amelia Earhart Award and the National Science Foundation Fellowship Award. Her PhD thesis, which was completed under the guidance of Bertrand Halperin and H. Eugene Stanley, was entitled Physics of disordered media: Aggregation and diffusion. Following her PhD, Selinger completed her postdoctoral work at the University of California, Los Angeles, the University of Maryland, and National Institute of Standards and Technology.

== Career ==
Following her postdoctoral work, Selinger joined the physics faculty at the Catholic University of America in 1995 and then spent a sabbatical at the United States Naval Research Laboratory from 2002 to 2003. While at CUA, she earned a National Science Foundation CAREER Award for her project Evolution of Dislocation Microstructures which ran from 1997 to 2000. She then moved to Kent State University as a full professor in 2005. As a professor at Kent State, Selinger co-hosted the Ohio STEM Project Fair which engaged high school students in Science, technology, engineering, and mathematics. She was also the Founding President of The Northeast Ohio STEM Alliance and served as a consultant to the Educational Testing Service for the Physics Graduate Record Examinations and Praxis General Science Examination programs. Later in her career, Selinger helped develop the Liquid Crystal Institute's Master of Science in Liquid Crystal Engineering to explore the "application of liquid crystal engineering in addition to the fundamentals of liquid crystal technology."

In 2016, Selinger became the first female faculty member at Kent State University to be elected a Fellow of the American Physical Society (APS). She was recognized for her "fundamental contributions in theory/simulation of materials, focusing on liquid crystals, polymers and lipid membranes" and her outreach activities. Following this, she was among eight researchers who published findings that demonstrated the potential application of photoactive films in light-driven locomotion and self-cleaning surfaces. Selinger was elected to the APS Council of Representatives beginning in 2019 and served as Speaker of the Council in 2022. In January 2020, Selinger was elected to a three-year term on the APS Board of Directors.

== Personal life ==
Selinger and her husband Jonathan are active members of Temple Beth Shalom in Hudson, Ohio; she is the cantorial soloist while he is past-president of the congregation. They have two adult children.
