= Austen Angell =

Australian chemist (1933-2021)

Charles Angell
- Born: Charles Austen Angell; 14 December 1933; Canberra, Australia
- Died: 12 March 2021 (aged 87); Phoenix, Arizona, U.S.
- Education: Imperial College London (PhD)
- Known for: Kinetic fragility, Angell plot
- Scientific career
- Fields: Chemistry, physics, physical chemistry
- Workplaces: Arizona State University

Charles Austen Angell (14 December 1933 – 12 March 2021) was an Australian and American physical chemist known for his prolific and highly cited research on the chemistry and physics of glasses and glass-forming liquids. He was internationally recognized as a luminary in the fields of glasses, liquids, water and ionic liquids.

His best known contribution is probably the development of the fragility concept and the "strong–fragile" classification of viscous liquids in general. The plot of logarithm of viscosity of liquids of all types to be placed on the same diagram by using the reduced temperature scale with the glass transition temperature T_{g} as scaling parameter, is widely known as the "Angell plot".

He was a pioneer of discovering the extraordinary behavior of supercooled water and launched the modern era of exploring the anomalies of water, which transformed the understanding of the most common substance on Earth in modern physics and chemistry. He was one of the first scientists to embrace molecular simulations for gaining insights into the amorphous materials and liquids. He also worked on the problems of ionic liquids and Li battery electrolytes. He is credited with the "decoupling index" concept for characterizing the freedom of conducting species and with the "polymer-in-salt" concept for lithium battery electrolytes. He was a "visionary explorer of glasses and the limits of the liquid state".

== Early life and education ==
Austen Angell was born in Canberra, Australia, in 1933, the first child of Herbert and Kate Angell. His father was a plant pathologist with a wide range of hobbies from reassembling model T Ford to grinding telescope lens. He recalled his father's casting of aluminum parts from scrap aircraft in a dining room fireplace that got his interest in molten liquids at an early age.

After high school, he went to University of Melbourne for undergraduate studies in Chemical Metallurgy. After graduation, he worked on molten salts with electrochemist John Bockris at the University of Pennsylvania. He went on to Imperial College London as the Stanley Elmore Fellow to pursue a PhD degree working with a physical chemist John Tomlinson. After two and half years working on metal-molten salt solution, he wrote his PhD thesis on self-diffusion in molten Cd-CdCl2 solution and TlCl, which earned him the biennial Armstrong Medal for graduate research. Before he returned to Australia, he embarked on a six-month adventure in a Volkswagen Beetle across Africa from Liberia to Sudan, venturing through the Sahara Desert, and back to the UK through Egypt and the east coast of Mediterranean Sea (via Jordan, Syria and Turkey). He often alluded to this trip nostalgically, as 6 months of bliss in "the most human place," and always encouraged others to travel and visit the world and its people.

== Career and research ==
In 1964, Austen Angell joined the Argonne National Laboratory and worked with Dieter Gruen on transition metal spectroscopy and ionic solvent effects on cation coordination. Two years later, he was appointed as a faculty member of the Chemistry Department at Purdue University, West Lafayette, IN, US. With his students and postdocs, he studied glass forming aqueous solutions and discovered the paradoxical behavior of water in its supercooled liquid state. His postdoc Robin Speedy and he showed that water's compressibility and heat capacity, among other properties, exhibited anomalous behaviors, unlike all other molecular liquids, as it is supercooled. The implications of the predicted singularity at −45 °C (known as Speedy–Angell conjecture) have sparked tremendous scientific interest in the exotic aspects of the most common substance on Earth – water, which is still a matter of debate 50 years later.

After about 20 years at Purdue, Angell moved to Arizona State University in 1989, while his concept of fragility had been popularizing in the scientific field, becoming widely recognized as a fundamental paradigm of glass and liquid sciences. In 1995, Angell contributed a lead article on amorphous materials to Science Magazine, where he blended the subject of glass forming liquids with additional features of sudden changes to different amorphous forms in anomalous liquids (known as polyamorphism). This article, entitled "Formation of glasses from liquids and biopolymers" has become Angell's most cited work. In 1998, the Journal of Physical Chemistry B devoted a special issue "C. Austen Angell Festschrift" to recognize Angell's contributions to physical chemistry, featuring the "Angell-plot" on the cover page. Of the many subjects in which he was interested, water was one of his most favored. Together with his colleagues, he pushed water and its salt solutions to extreme conditions via supercooling and negative pressures, and simulated these scenarios using molecular dynamics models. He placed water to a broader spectrum of anomalous liquids such as silicon, germanium, tellurium, and silica, and proposed that they undergo a fragile to strong transition on cooling. He was among the first to realize that water-like anomalies may play a role in the functionalities of nonvolatile phase-change memory devices.

He was a Regents Professor at Arizona State University. With contributions across scientific disciplines, he was considered as "one of the most versatile physical chemists of his generation". He received internationally contested awards from four separate scientific societies, the American Chemical Society, the Materials Research Society, the American Ceramic Society, and the Electrochemical Society (see Awards and Honors). For many young scientists around the world, he was "an icon, a source of inspiration and a true friend".

== Awards and honors ==
- George W. Morey Award from The American Ceramic Society (1989)
- Joel Henry Hildebrand Award from the American Chemical Society (2004)
- David Turnbull Lectureship Award from the Materials Research Society (2006)
- The Max Bredig Award from The Electrochemical Society (2010)
- University College London's Bragg lecturer (2015)
- Otto Schott Research Award (2018)
- 2018 ISPE Galileo Galilei Award (2018)
- Gothenburg Lise Meitner Award from the Gothenburg (Sweden) Physics Centre (2019).
