= Viscous liquid =

Term for fluids with high levels of viscosity

In condensed matter physics and physical chemistry, the terms viscous liquid, supercooled liquid, and glass forming liquid are often used interchangeably to designate liquids that are at the same time highly viscous (see Viscosity of amorphous materials), can be or are supercooled, and able to form a glass.

== Working points in glass processing ==
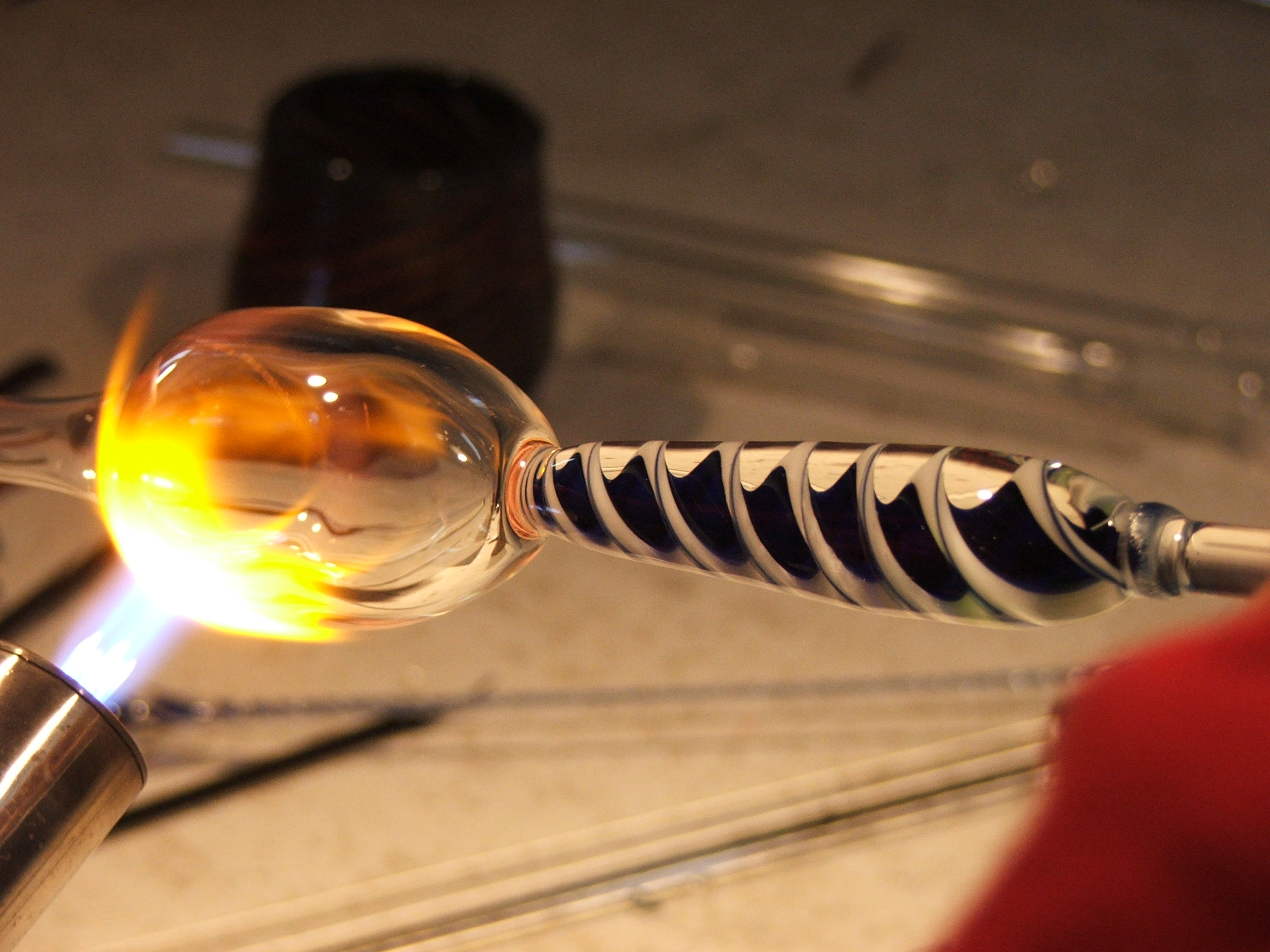
Glassblowing is done at about the working point.

The mechanical properties of glass-forming liquids depend primarily on the viscosity. Therefore, the following working points are defined in terms of viscosity. The temperature is indicated for industrial soda lime glass:

designation	viscosity (Pa.s)	temperature ( °C, in soda lime glass)
melting point	10^{1}	1300
working point	10^{3}	950-1000
sink point	10^{3.22}	
flow point	10^{4}	~900
softening point (Littleton)	10^{6.6}	600
softening point (dilatometric)	~10^{10.3}	>~500
annealing point	~10^{12}	<~500
transition point	10^{12}..10^{12.6}	<~500
strain point	~10^{13.5}	<~500

== Fragile-strong classification ==
In a widespread classification, due to chemist Austen Angell, a glass-forming liquid is called strong if its viscosity approximately obeys an Arrhenius law (log η is linear in 1/T). In the opposite case of clearly non-Arrhenius behaviour the liquid is called fragile. This classification has no direct relation with the common usage of the word "fragility" to mean brittleness. Viscous flow in amorphous materials is characterised by deviations from the Arrhenius-type behaviour: the activation energy of viscosity Q changes from a high value Q_{H} at low temperatures (in the glassy state) to a low value Q_{L} at high temperatures (in the liquid state). Amorphous materials are classified accordingly to the deviation from Arrhenius type behaviour of their viscosities as either strong when Q_{H}-Q_{L}<Q_{L} or fragile when Q_{H}-Q_{L}≥Q_{L}. The fragility of amorphous materials is numerically characterized by the Doremus' fragility ratio R_{D}=Q_{H}/Q_{L} . Strong melts are those with (R_{D}-1) < 1, whereas fragile melts are those with (R_{D}-1) ≥ 1. Fragility is related to materials bond breaking processes caused by thermal fluctuations. Bond breaking modifies the properties of an amorphous material so that the higher the concentration of broken bonds termed configurons the lower the viscosity. Materials with a higher enthalpy of configuron formation compared with their enthalpy of motion have a higher Doremus fragility ratio, conversely melts with a relatively lower enthalpy of configuron formation have a lower fragility. More recently, the fragility has been quantitatively related to the details of the interatomic or intermolecular potential, and it has been shown that steeper interatomic potentials lead to more fragile liquids.

== Mode-coupling theory ==
The microscopic dynamics at low to moderate viscosities is addressed by a mode-coupling theory, developed by Wolfgang Götze and collaborators since the 1980s. This theory describes a slowing down of structural relaxation on cooling towards a critical temperature Tc, typically located 20% above Tg.

== Notes and sources ==
=== Textbooks ===
- Götze, W (2009): Complex Dynamics of glass forming liquids. A mode-coupling theory. Oxford: Oxford University Press.
- Zarzycki, J (1982): Les Verres et l'état vitreux. Paris: Masson. Also available in English translations.
