= Nikolay Dokholyan =

Russian-American Biophysicist, academic and researcher

Nikolay V. Dokholyan
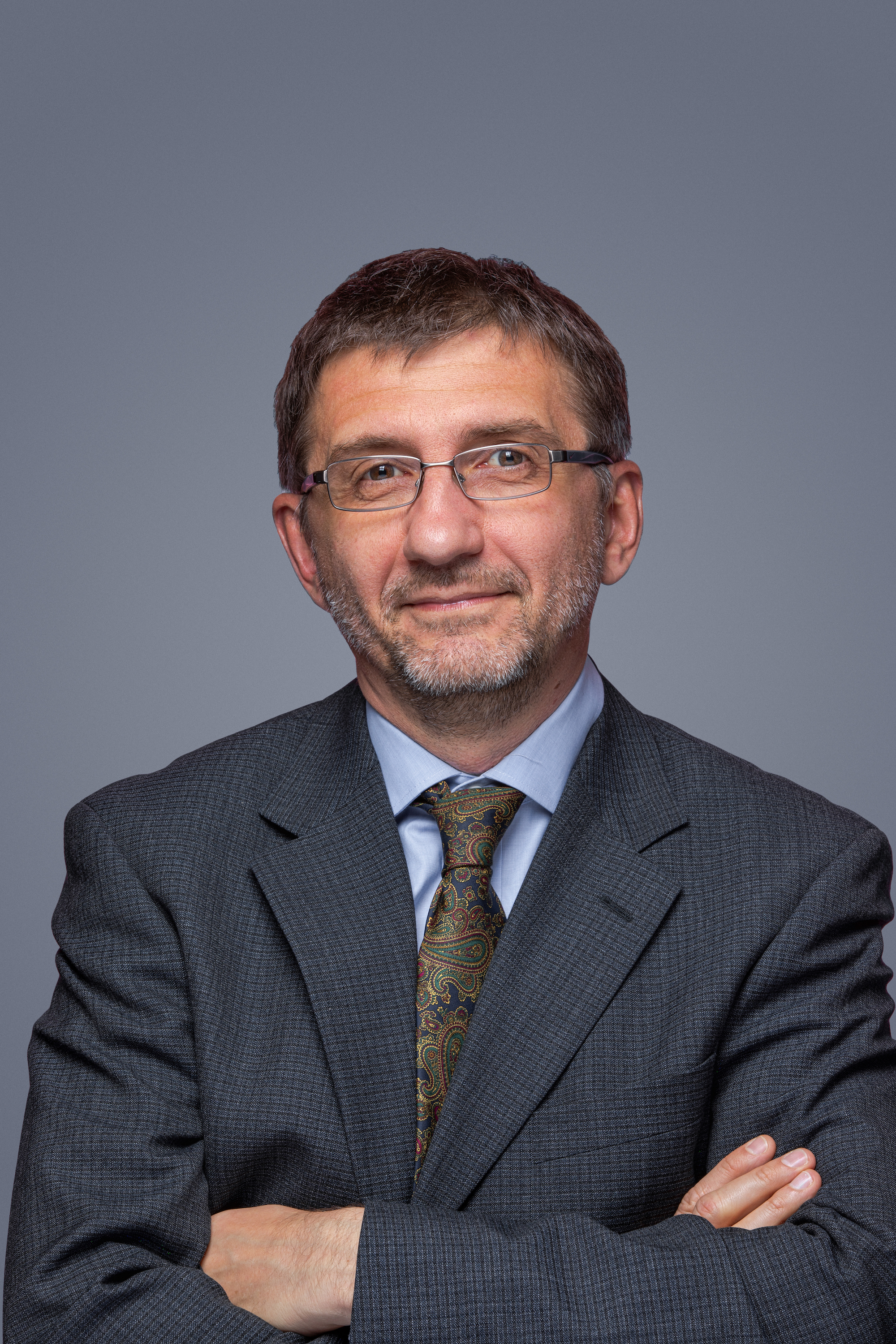
- Born: Tbilisi, Republic of Georgia
- Occupations: Biophysicist, academic and researcher
- Awards: March of Dimes Basil O'Connor Starter Scholar Research Award; Fellow, American Physical Society; Michael Hooker Distinguished Professorship; G. Thomas Passananti Professorship; Distinguished Edmond J. Safra Center Speaker, Tel Aviv University; Fellow, American Association for the Advancement of Science; Fellow, American Institute for Medical and Biological Engineering (AIMBE)

Academic background
- Education: B.S., Physics; M.S., Physics; Ph.D., Physics
- Alma mater: Moscow Institute of Physics and Technology, Russia; Boston University, USA

Academic work
- Institutions: University of Virginia

Nikolay V. Dokholyan is an American biophysicist and computational biologist. He is the Weir M. and Linden C. Tucker Professor of Neurology at the University of Virginia School of Medicine, holding joint appointments across pharmacology, biomedical engineering, neuroscience, and microbiology. He is also the Editor-in-Chief of the scientific journal Proteins: Structure, Function, and Bioinformatics.

Dokholyan is recognized for developing and applying computational biophysics methods—particularly Discrete Molecular Dynamics (DMD) and the Medusa modeling suite—to understand biomolecular dynamics, protein misfolding mechanisms in neurodegenerative disorders (such as ALS, Alzheimer's, and Parkinson's disease), rational drug discovery, RNA structural modeling, and the optogenetic/chemogenetic engineering of proteins and cellular logic circuits. He is an elected Fellow of the American Physical Society (APS), the American Association for the Advancement of Science (AAAS), and the American Institute for Medical and Biological Engineering (AIMBE).

== Early life and education ==
Dokholyan received his Bachelor of Science (1992) and Master of Science (1994) degrees in physics with highest honors ("Red Diploma") from the Moscow Institute of Physics and Technology (MIPT). He then moved to the United States to pursue doctoral studies in physics at Boston University under the mentorship of statistical physicist H. Eugene Stanley, earning his Ph.D. in 1999. His early doctoral research applied statistical physics, scaling theory, and percolation models to polymer dynamics and DNA sequence statistics.

From 1999 to 2002, Dokholyan was an NIH Postdoctoral Fellow in the Department of Chemistry and Chemical Biology at Harvard University, working with Eugene Shakhnovich on protein folding mechanisms, protein designability, and molecular evolution.

== Academic career ==
- University of North Carolina at Chapel Hill (2002–2018): Dokholyan joined the UNC School of Medicine faculty in 2002 as an Assistant Professor in the Department of Biochemistry and Biophysics. He rose through the ranks to Associate Professor with tenure (2008), Full Professor (2011), and was appointed the Michael Hooker Distinguished Professor in 2014. During his tenure at UNC, he served as the Director of the Center for Computational and Systems Biology (2009–2014) and Graduate Director of the Program in Cellular and Molecular Biophysics (2007–2014).
- Penn State College of Medicine (2018–2025): In 2018, Dokholyan joined the Pennsylvania State University College of Medicine as the G. Thomas Passananti Professor, Professor of Biochemistry & Molecular Biology, and Vice Chair for Research in the Department of Pharmacology. He also held adjunct appointments in Chemistry and Biomedical Engineering and served as Associate Director of the Penn State Clinical and Translational Science Institute (CTSI).
- University of Virginia (2025–present): In 2025, Dokholyan joined the University of Virginia School of Medicine faculty, where in 2026 he was endowed as the Weir M. and Linden C. Tucker Professor of Neurology. He holds appointments in Neurology, Biomedical Engineering, Pharmacology, Neuroscience, and Microbiology, Immunology, and Cancer Biology, and is an active member of the UVA Brain Institute and the UVA Comprehensive Cancer Center.

== Research Contributions ==
Dokholyan's research operates at the interface of statistical physics, structural biology, computation, and translational medicine.

1. Discrete Molecular Dynamics (DMD) and Multiscale Modeling

Dokholyan pioneered the modern adaptation of Discrete Molecular Dynamics (DMD)—an event-driven simulation algorithm—for rapid, all-atom and coarse-grained conformational sampling of biomacromolecules. By replacing continuous potential functions with step-function potentials, DMD enables sampling of large-scale conformational transitions, macromolecular crowding effects, and long-timescale folding/aggregation events that are computationally prohibitive with traditional continuous MD. His laboratory expanded DMD into several open-access web platforms, including iFold and iFoldRNA, for automated ab initio protein and RNA 3D structural modeling driven by physical force fields and sparse experimental constraints.

2. Protein Misfolding and Neurodegenerative Diseases

A central focus of Dokholyan’s work has been delineating the molecular origins of cytotoxic intermediates in neurodegenerative disorders:

Amyotrophic Lateral Sclerosis (ALS): His laboratory uncovered that non-native, soluble trimeric species of Cu,Zn superoxide dismutase (SOD1)—rather than large fibrillar inclusions—act as primary neurotoxic drivers in ALS pathogenesis. He developed structural models explaining how familial ALS mutations and post-translational modifications destabilize the native homodimer to favor trimer assembly, subsequently engineering conformation-specific synthetic antibodies targeting trimeric SOD1 for diagnostic and therapeutic applications.

Alzheimer's and Parkinson's Diseases: Dokholyan investigated the early aggregation pathways of amyloid-beta (Aβ), tau, and \alpha-synuclein. His team characterized the conformational heterogeneity of \alpha-synuclein oligomers and elucidated the regulatory roles of lipid transport and membrane environments (such as GM1 gangliosides and APOE lipidation) in modulating toxic oligomer nucleation.

3. Protein Engineering, Optogenetics, and Cell Logic Circuits

In collaboration with experimental biologists, Dokholyan developed computational frameworks for designing allosteric regulation into functional enzymes and signaling proteins:

Optogenetic and Chemogenetic Switches: By engineering extrinsic disorder and embedding light- or small-molecule-sensitive control domains (such as LOV2 or engineered FKBP), his group generated switches enabling optical control of kinases (e.g., focal adhesion kinase, Pak1) and GTPases in living cells and whole organisms.

Combinatorial Protein Logic Gates: He engineered multi-input, non-commutative protein logic circuits capable of performing autonomous nanobiological computing inside living cells to direct phenotypes such as cell orientation and directional motility.

Septin Engineering for Immunotherapy: His lab engineered optogenetic and structural variants of cytoskeletal septin proteins (such as Septin-7) to mechanically reprogram T-cell transmigration, facilitating improved infiltration into dense solid tumor microenvironments.

4. Computational Drug Discovery and the Medusa Platform

Dokholyan developed several widely used computational tools for structure-based drug design and stability engineering:

Medusa & Eris: A flexible-backbone force field and modeling suite used for predicting the thermodynamic impact of amino acid mutations on protein stability and macromolecular interactions.

MedusaDock & Yuel: Advanced molecular docking algorithms that account for simultaneous ligand and receptor flexibility. Recent iterations have integrated deep Euclidean neural networks, transfer learning, and quantum machine learning algorithms to enable high-throughput proteome-wide compound screening.

Translational Pharmacology: His computational modeling efforts have directly contributed to discovering allosteric modulators for cystic fibrosis transmembrane conductance regulator (CFTR), novel agonists and antagonists for \mu-opioid receptor splice variants, and small molecules targeting pain pathways and cancer resistance mechanisms.

5. RNA Tertiary Structure Refinement and Nanotechnology

Dokholyan co-developed methods integrating chemical probing experiments (such as SHAPE and hydroxyl radical footprinting) with discrete molecular dynamics to model complex 3D RNA architectures. He has been a regular participant and organizer within the community-wide RNA-Puzzles assessment. Furthermore, his group designs nucleic acid nanoparticles (NANPs) and aptamer-based fibrous nanoscaffolds for targeted drug delivery and immunomodulatory therapeutics.

Dokholyan's research falls in the areas of computational biology, translational science, biophysics, and biochemistry. His work is focused on developing and understanding basic principles of protein misfolding in neurodegenerative diseases using computational and experimental approaches. His lab has explored the approaches to molecular dynamics simulations and modeling, and drug discovery, while focusing on both biological therapeutics and small molecule screening.

== Editorial and Advisory Service ==
Editorial Leadership:

- Editor-in-Chief, Proteins: Structure, Function, and Bioinformatics (2021–present; Editorial Board Member since 2007)
- Board of Reviewing Editors, PNAS Nexus (2024–present)
- Book Series Editor, Series in Computational Biophysics (CRC Press / Taylor & Francis)
- Editor-in-Chief, Research and Reports in Biochemistry (2011–2016)

Government and Scientific Review:

- Member, Drug Discovery and Molecular Pharmacology B (DMPB) Study Section, National Institutes of Health (2026–2030)
- Expert Witness / Invited Speaker before the U.S. Senate Committee on Finance Subcommittee on Health Care (Hearing on “The Alzheimer’s Crisis: Examining Testing and Treatment Pipelines”, 2021)
- Advisory and review panelist for the National Science Foundation (NSF), Department of Defense (CDMRP), and international scientific agencies.

== Entrepreneurship and Patents ==
Dokholyan is the founder of biotech ventures including Molecules in Action, LLC (2008) and CFold, Inc. (2013). He holds several U.S. and international patents and patent applications covering:

- Synthetic antibodies for trimeric SOD1 ALS biomarkers.
- Septin engineering methods to enhance immune-cell infiltration into solid tumors.
- Aptamer-based nanofibers and conditional kill-switches.
- Rationally engineered miniature ACE2 mimics and epitope-targeted SARS-CoV-2 neutralizing polypeptides.
- Allosteric correctors and modulators for the CFTR channel in cystic fibrosis.
- Isoform-selective compounds targeting \mu-opioid receptors.

== Honors and Distinctions ==
- 2026: Weir M. and Linden C. Tucker Endowed Professorship of Neurology (University of Virginia)
- 2022: Elected Fellow, American Institute for Medical and Biological Engineering (AIMBE)
- 2019: Elected Fellow, American Association for the Advancement of Science (AAAS)
- 2018: G. Thomas Passananti Endowed Professorship (Penn State College of Medicine)
- 2014: Michael Hooker Distinguished Professorship (UNC Chapel Hill)
- 2013: Elected Fellow, American Physical Society (APS)
- 2004: Basil O’Connor Starter Scholar Research Award (March of Dimes)
- 2004: IBM Junior Faculty Development Award
- 1999: National Institutes of Health (NIH) Postdoctoral Fellowship

== Selected Landmark Publications ==
- Dagliyan, O., Tarnawski, M., Chu, P. H., Shirvanyants, D., Schlichting, I., Dokholyan, N. V., & Hahn, K. M. (2016). "Engineering extrinsic disorder to control protein activity in living cells." Science, 354(6318), 1441–1444.
- Wang, J., Zhang, D. Y., Budakoti, S., and Dokholyan, N. V. (2026). "A diffusion-based framework for designing molecules in flexible protein pockets." Science Advances, 12(15), eaeb7045.
- Proctor, E. A., Fee, L., Tao, Y., Redler, R. L., Fay, J. M., Zhang, Y., ... & Dokholyan, N. V. (2016). "Nonnative SOD1 trimer is toxic to motor neurons in a model of amyotrophic lateral sclerosis." Proceedings of the National Academy of Sciences USA, 113(3), 614–619.
- Vishweshwaraiah, Y. L., Chen, J., Chirasani, V. R., Tabdanov, E. D., & Dokholyan, N. V. (2021). "Two-input protein logic gate for computation in living cells." Nature Communications, 12, 6615.
- Karginov, A. V., Ding, F., Kota, P., Dokholyan, N. V., & Hahn, K. M. (2010). "Engineered allosteric activation of kinases in living cells." Nature Biotechnology, 28(7), 743–748.
- Serohijos, A. W. R., Hegedűs, T., Aleksandrov, A. A., He, L., Cui, L., Dokholyan, N. V., & Riordan, J. R. (2008). "Phenylalanine-508 mediates a conformational switch in CFTR folding and function." Proceedings of the National Academy of Sciences USA, 105(9), 3256–3261.
- Ding, F., Tsao, D., Nie, H., & Dokholyan, N. V. (2008). "Ab initio folding of proteins with all-atom discrete molecular dynamics." Structure, 16(7), 1010–1018.
- Yin, S., Ding, F., & Dokholyan, N. V. (2007). "Eris: an automated estimator of protein stability." Nature Methods, 4(6), 466–467.
- Dokholyan, N. V., Li, L., Ding, F., & Shakhnovich, E. I. (2002). "Topological determinants of protein folding." Proceedings of the National Academy of Sciences USA, 99(13), 8637–8641.
