= Dynamical heterogeneity =

Dynamical heterogeneity describes the behavior of glass-forming materials when undergoing a phase transition from the liquid state to the glassy state. In dynamical heterogeneity, the dynamics of cooling to a glassy state show variation within the material.

== Polymers ==
Polymer properties include viscoelasticity and may be synthetic or natural. When a polymeric liquid is cooled below its freezing temperature without crystallizing, it becomes a supercooled liquid. When the supercooled liquid is further cooled, it becomes a glass.

The temperature at which a polymer becomes a glass by fast cooling is called the glass transition temperature T_{g}. At this temperature, viscosity reaches up to 10^{13} poise depending upon cooling-rate.

== Phase transitions ==
It is possible for a phase transition from polymer to glassy state to take place. Polymer glass transitions have many determinants including relaxation time, viscosity and cage size. At low temperatures the dynamics become very slow (sluggish) and relaxation time increases from picoseconds to seconds, minutes, or more. At high temperatures, the correlation function has a ballistic regime for very short times (when particles do not interact) and a microscopic regime. In the microscopic regime, the correlation functions decay exponentially at high temperatures. At low temperatures the correlation functions have an intermediate regime in which particles have both slow and fast relaxations. The slow relaxation is an indication of cages in the glassy system. In glassy state density is not homogeneous i.e. particles are localized in different density distributions in space. It means that density fluctuations are present in the system. Particle dynamics become very slow because temperature is directly proportional to kinetic energy causing the particles trapped in local regions by each other. Particles are doing rattling motion inside these cages and cooperate with each other. These regions in the glassy polymer are called cages. In the intermediate regime each particle has its own and different relaxation time.

The dynamics in all these cases are different, so at a small scale, there are a large number of cages in the system relative to the size of the whole system. This is known as dynamical heterogeneity in the glassy state of the system. A measurement of dynamical heterogeneity can be done by calculating correlation functions like Non-Gaussian parameter, four point correlation functions (Dynamic Susceptibility) and three time correlation functions.
