= Pair distribution function =

Distribution of distances between pairs of particles in a given volume

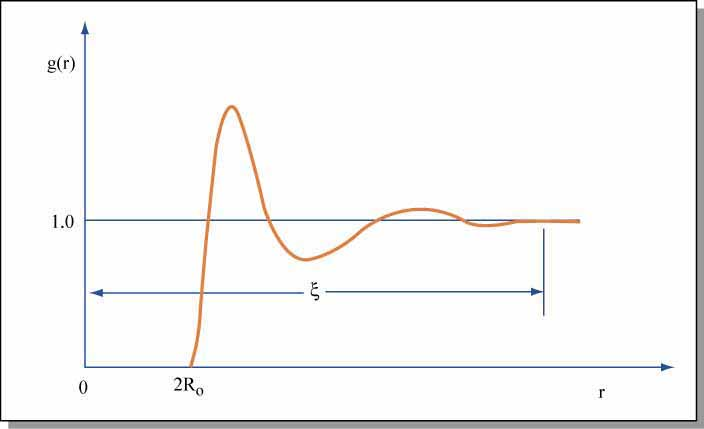
At several unit diameters, the average number of units/vol. becomes constant.

The pair distribution function describes the distribution of distances between pairs of particles contained within a given volume. Mathematically, if a and b are two particles, the pair distribution function of b with respect to a, denoted by $g_{ab}(\vec{r})$ is the probability of finding the particle b at distance $\vec{r}$ from a, with a taken as the origin of coordinates.

== Overview ==
The pair distribution function is used to describe the distribution of objects within a medium (for example, oranges in a crate or nitrogen molecules in a gas cylinder). If the medium is homogeneous (i.e. every spatial location has identical properties), then there is an equal probability density for finding an object at any position $\vec{r}$:

$$p(\vec{r})=1/V$$,

where $V$ is the volume of the container. On the other hand, the likelihood of finding pairs of objects at given positions (i.e. the two-body probability density) is not uniform. For example, pairs of hard balls must be separated by at least the diameter of a ball. The pair distribution function $g(\vec{r},\vec{r}')$ is obtained by scaling the two-body probability density function by the total number of objects $N$ and the size of the container:

$$g(\vec{r}, \vec{r}') = p(\vec{r},\vec{r}') V^2 \frac{N-1}{N}$$.

In the common case where the number of objects in the container is large, this simplifies to give:

$$g(\vec{r}, \vec{r}') \approx p(\vec{r},\vec{r}') V^2$$.

== Simple models and general properties ==
The simplest possible pair distribution function assumes that all object locations are mutually independent, giving:

$$g(\vec{r})=1$$,

where $\vec{r}$ is the separation between a pair of objects. However, this is inaccurate in the case of hard objects as discussed above, because it does not account for the minimum separation required between objects. The hole-correction (HC) approximation provides a better model:

$$g(r) =
\begin{cases}
0,&r<b,\\
1,&r\geq{}b
\end{cases},$$

where $b$ is the diameter of one of the objects.

Although the HC approximation gives a reasonable description of sparsely packed objects, it breaks down for dense packing. This may be illustrated by considering a box completely filled by identical hard balls so that each ball touches its neighbours. In this case, every pair of balls in the box is separated by a distance of exactly $r=nb$ where $n$ is a positive whole number. The pair distribution for a volume completely filled by hard spheres is therefore a set of Dirac delta functions of the form:

$$g(r)=\sum\limits_i\delta(r-ib)$$.

Finally, it may be noted that a pair of objects which are separated by a large distance have no influence on each other's position (provided that the container is not completely filled). Therefore,

$$\lim\limits_{r\to\infty}g(r) = 1$$.

In general, a pair distribution function will take a form somewhere between the sparsely packed (HC approximation) and the densely packed (delta function) models, depending on the packing density $f$.

== Radial distribution function ==
Of special practical importance is the radial distribution function, which is independent of orientation. It is a major descriptor for the atomic structure of amorphous materials (glasses, polymers) and liquids. The radial distribution function can be calculated directly from physical measurements like light scattering or x-ray powder diffraction by performing a Fourier Transform.

In Statistical Mechanics the RDF is given by the expression

$g_{ab}(r) = \frac{1}{N_{a} N_b}\sum\limits_{i=1}^{N_a} \sum\limits_{j=1}^{N_b} \langle \delta( \vert \mathbf{r}_{ij} \vert -r)\rangle$

== Applications ==
=== Thin Film Pair Distribution Function ===
When thin films are disordered, as they are in electronic devices, pair distribution is used to view the strain and structure-properties of that material or composition. They have these properties that cannot be exploited in the bulk or crystalline form. There is a method with the radial distribution that is able to view the local structure of a disordered thin film of $\ce{GeSe2}$. But the creators of this method called a need for a better method to view the mid-range order of disordered films. The creation of thin-film Pair Distribution Function (tfPDF) uses a statistical distribution of a material's mid-range order that enables viewing important details like the disorder. In this technique, 2D data from a scattering method is integrated and Fourier transformed into 1D data that shows the probability of bonds in that material. TfPDF works best when in conjunction with other characterization methods like transmission electron microscopy. Although a developing methodology, tfPDF can give complete structure-property relationships through a reliable characterization technique.

=== Pair Distribution Function Analysis ===
Atomic pair distribution function (PDF) analysis contains both Bragg peaks and diffuse scattering components within the diffraction pattern. Due to this, the existing atomic order characterized by Bragg peaks is combined with defects within the structure to produce a PDF. This allows PDF analysis to better characterize materials with a broken periodicity due to structural distortion when compared to traditional powder x-ray analysis.

== See also ==
- classical-map hypernetted-chain method
