= E. G. D. Cohen =

Dutch–American physicist

- Born: Ezechiel Godert David Cohen; January 16, 1923; Amsterdam, Netherlands
- Died: September 24, 2017 (aged 94); Iowa City, Iowa, USA
- Known for: Non-equilibrium statistical mechanics
- Awards: Boltzmann Medal (2004)
- Scientific career
- Fields: Statistical mechanics
- Workplaces: The Rockefeller University; University of Iowa
- Doctoral advisor: Jan de Boer

Ezechiel Godert David "Eddie" Cohen (January 16, 1923 – September 24, 2017) was a Dutch–American physicist and Professor Emeritus at The Rockefeller University. He is widely recognised for his contributions to statistical physics. In 2004 Cohen was awarded the Boltzmann Medal, jointly with Prof. H. Eugene Stanley. Cohen's citation read "For his fundamental contributions to nonequilibrium statistical mechanics, including the development of a theory of transport phenomena in dense gases, and the characterization of measures and fluctuations in nonequilibrium stationary states."

== Personal profile ==
Ezechiel (Eddie) Godert David Cohen was born in Amsterdam in 1923. He spent World War II being sheltered in safe houses in the Netherlands. He received his B.Sc. at the University of Amsterdam in 1952 and his Ph.D. at the University of Amsterdam in 1957. He was a research associate for two years at the University of Michigan, Ann Arbor working with George Uhlenbeck and Theodore Berlin, the Johns Hopkins University and an associate professor at the Institute for Theoretical Physics at the University of Amsterdam before moving to the Rockefeller University in New York as a professor in 1963. In 2004 Cohen received the triannual Boltzmann Medal from the Committee on Thermodynamics and Statistical Mechanics of the International Union of Pure and Applied Physics, its highest award for contributions to statistical mechanics. In that same year, he was honored with a Royal Knighthood in the Order of the Dutch Lion. He is the editor of a number of books, including the series Fundamental Problems in Statistical Mechanics, I–VI, which contains an account of the developments in his field over almost 45 years. These books contain the proceedings of a summer school in statistical mechanics that he founded in 1961 in the Netherlands.

In 1979 Cohen became a corresponding member of the Royal Netherlands Academy of Arts and Sciences.

He was survived by his son Dr. Michael B. Cohen, chair of Pathology at Wake Forest Baptist Hospital in Winston-Salem, North Carolina, and his wife Margaret A Cohen (King), his daughter Andrea M. Cohen of Iowa City, former Executive Director of the Iowa United Nations Association, and her husband Rene Postma, as well as four grandchildren (Alyssa (New York City)), Rianna (Winston-Salem, North Carolina), Isabella (Washington, DC); and, Jim (Iowa City, Iowa). He was preceded in death by his parents Dr. D. E. Cohen and Sophia L. Cohen (de Sterke) who both were murdered in Auschwitz after being betrayed from hiding in the Netherlands, and his wife Marina A. Cohen (Rietje) (192–2013) (married in 1950).

== Research interests ==
Early in his career, Cohen predicted the possibility of an incomplete phase separation in liquid helium mixtures at very low temperatures that was later discovered experimentally, leading to the design of the helium dilution refrigerator, one of the basic low-temperature instruments available.

For most of Cohen's career he has focused on nonequilibrium statistical mechanics. Together with J. Robert Dorfman in the 1960s he proved that a power series expansion of transport coefficients in the density (analogous to the virial expansion of the pressure in terms of the density), is in fact divergent. This discovery effectively closed off one entire line of research in nonequilibrium statistical mechanics.

Later with Denis Evans and Gary Morriss in 1990 he proved that for certain classes of thermostatted nonequilibrium steady states the relevant transport coefficient has a simple relation to the sum of the largest and smallest Lyapunov exponents describing the trajectory of the N-particle steady state system in phase space. This relation is called the Conjugate Pairing Rule. This was the first practical relationship between chaotic measures and thermophysical properties.

In 1993 Denis Evans, Cohen and Gary Morriss announced the first steady state Fluctuation Theorem describing asymptotic fluctuations of time averaged fluctuations of what has since become known as dissipation, in nonequilibrium steady states. In the same paper they also gave a heuristic proof of that relation using local Lyapunov weights.

In 1995 Gallavotti and Cohen described a proof employing the so-called chaotic hypothesis, of the so-called Gallavotti Cohen Fluctuation Theorem. This proof formalised the heuristic proof given in 1993 by Denis Evans, Cohen and Gary Morriss.

Another interest of Cohen's is the diffusion of independent point particles moving on a lattice occupied by two kinds of obstacles that scatter the particles according to certain deterministic scattering rules. This mixture of random and deterministic features has led to a number of new types of particle diffusion, which can evolve suddenly to propagation. Cohen's lab has focused on determining a numerical approach to understand the origin of this phenomenon, because neither probability theory nor kinetic theory is applicable to these systems.

In 2003, he introduced along with Christian Beck the formalism of superstatistics.

== Selected publications ==
- "Difficulties in the kinetic theory of dense gases", with J. R. Dorfman, Journal of Mathematical Physics Vol. 8, p. 282, 1967
- Editor, "Statistical Mechanics at the Turn of the Decade", Dekker 1971 (Festschrift for the 70th birthday of Uhlenbeck), including his essay: "The generalization of the Boltzmann equation to higher densities"
- The Boltzmann Equation, with Walter Thirring (editors), Vienna 1973
- "The kinetic theory of dense gases", in Cohen (editor), Fundamental problems of statistical mechanics, Vol. 2, North Holland, 1968.
- "Kinetic approach to non-equilibrium phenomena", The Physicist's Conception of Nature, Reidel, 1973
- "The kinetic theory of fluids-an introduction", Physics Today, January 1984
- "Kinetic theory – Understanding nature through collisions", American Journal of Physics, Vol. 60, 1993, p. 524
- "Transport coefficients and Lyapunov exponents", Physica A 213, 293 (1995).
- "Boltzmann and Statistical Mechanics", 1996
- "George E. Uhlenbeck and Statistical Mechanics", American Journal of Physics, 58, 618(1990).
- "Viscosity of a simple fluid from its maximal Lyapunov exponents", with Evans and Morriss, Physical Review A, 42, pp. 5990–5997, 1990.
- "Probability of second law violations in nonequilibrium steady states", Physical Review Letters, 71, pp. 2401–2404 (1993); erratum, 71, 3616 (1993).

== See also ==
- Fluctuation theorem
- Boltzmann
- George Uhlenbeck
