= Double group =

Symmetry groups for systems with half-integer spin

A double group is a symmetry group used in physics and chemistry for systems with half-integer spin or, more generally, half-integer total angular momentum, such as atoms and ions with an odd number of electrons. Because the wavefunction of such a system changes sign under a rotation by 360° (an effect illustrated by the plate trick), this rotation, denoted R, must be treated as a symmetry operation distinct from the identity E; combining each operation of a point group with R doubles the number of elements. Double groups were introduced by Hans Bethe in 1929 to describe the splitting of atomic energy levels in crystals, and in 1940 Wladyslaw Opechowski gave rules for the classes of the crystallographic double groups. They are used in crystal field theory, in the treatment of spin–orbit coupling and of electronic band structures, and in the analysis of Kramers degeneracy; in mathematics, the double groups of the rotation groups are known as binary polyhedral groups.

== Background ==
In group theory, the character $\chi$ for rotation of a wavefunction with angular momentum quantum number J by an angle α is given by

$$\chi^J (\alpha) = \frac{\sin  (J+{1\over 2})\alpha} {\sin {1\over 2} \alpha }$$

where $J = L + S$; angular momentum is the vector sum of orbital and spin angular momentum. If J is half-integer, as for an atom or ion with an odd number of electrons, then (J + 1/2)·2π is an odd multiple of π, so that the character for a rotation through an angle $2\pi+\alpha$ is minus the character for a rotation through $\alpha$:

$$\chi^J (2\pi+\alpha) = -\chi^J (\alpha)$$

In particular, the character of a rotation through $2\pi$ is $-(2J+1)$, whereas the character of the identity operation is $2J+1$. Rotation by $2\pi$ must therefore be treated as a symmetry operation R distinct from the identity E; only rotation by $4\pi$ is equivalent to E.

== Construction ==
For each operation g of a molecular or crystallographic point group G, the double group G′ contains the two operations g and gR; it thus has twice as many elements as G. For a group of proper rotations, G′ is the preimage of G under the two-to-one homomorphism from SU(2) onto the rotation group SO(3). In general, G′ is not the direct product of G with the group {E, R}; for example, the double group of D_{2} is the quaternion group. Each class of G gives rise either to two classes of G′ or to a single class of twice the size: a rotation C_{n} with n > 2 and the operation C_{n}R always lie in different classes, whereas C_{2} and C_{2}R lie in the same class if there is a two-fold axis perpendicular to the axis of C_{2}. For improper operations, the usual convention is that the inversion i commutes with all operations and satisfies i^{2} = E; a reflection σ = iC_{2} then satisfies σ^{2} = R.

The irreducible representations of G′ are of two kinds. In the single-valued representations, R is represented by the unit matrix, so that g and gR have the same character; these are just the representations of G. In the double-valued (spinor) representations, R is represented by minus the unit matrix, so that the character of gR is minus that of g; states with half-integer J transform according to these representations. If the system is invariant under time reversal, each energy level that belongs to a double-valued representation is at least twofold degenerate, even where the representation is one-dimensional (Kramers' theorem). The representations are labelled either in Bethe's notation Γ_{1}, Γ_{2}, …, or with Mulliken symbols, the double-valued representations being distinguished by half-integer subscripts such as E_{1/2}, E_{3/2} and G_{3/2}.

As an example, the character table of the double group D′_{4} is given below. Operations shown in the same column, such as C_{4} and C_{4}^{3}R, belong to the same class; the operations added by the doubling are shown in the second row. The representations A_{1}, A_{2}, B_{1}, B_{2} and E are single-valued, E_{1/2} and E_{3/2} are double-valued.

Character table: double group D′_{4}
D′_{4}	E		C_{4}	C_{4}^{3}	C_{2}	2C′_{2}	2C″_{2}
		R	C_{4}^{3}R	C_{4}R	C_{2}R	2C′_{2}R	2C″_{2}R
A_{1}	1	1	1	1	1	1	1
A_{2}	1	1	1	1	1	−1	−1
B_{1}	1	1	−1	−1	1	1	−1
B_{2}	1	1	−1	−1	1	−1	1
E	2	2	0	0	−2	0	0
E_{1/2}	2	−2	√2	−√2	0	0	0
E_{3/2}	2	−2	−√2	√2	0	0	0

Character tables for the double groups T′, O′, T_{d}′, D_{3h}′, C_{6v}′, D_{6}′, D_{2d}′, C_{4v}′, D_{4}′, C_{3v}′, D_{3}′, C_{2v}′, D_{2}′ and R(3)′ are given in Salthouse and Ware.

== Applications ==
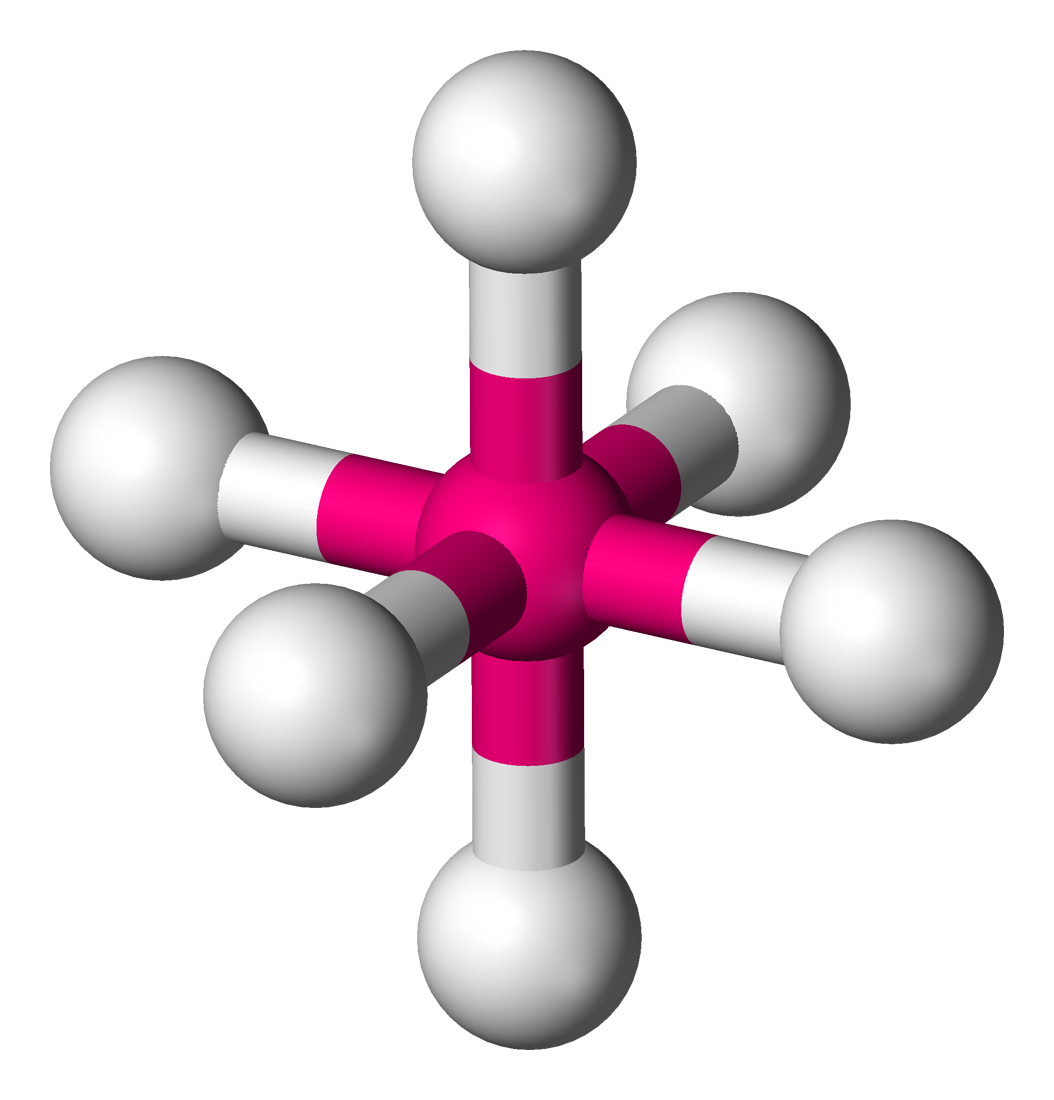
Sub-structure at the center of an octahedral complex

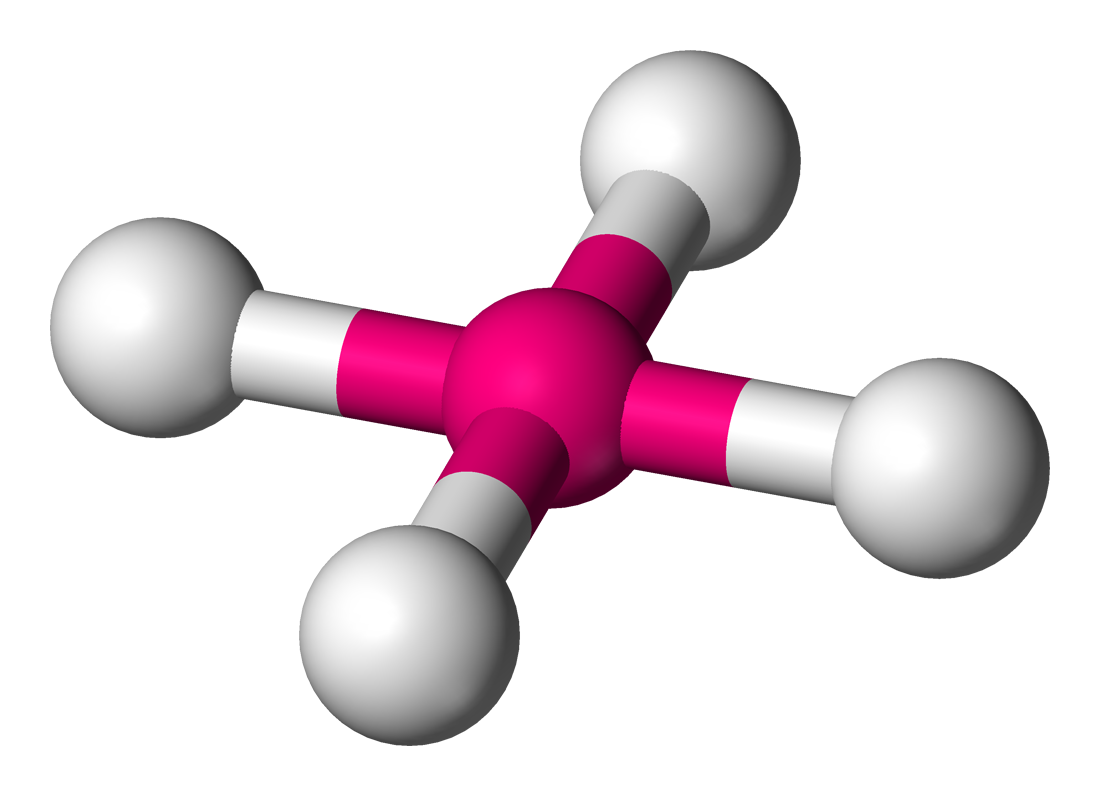
Structure of a square-planar complex ion such as [AgF_{4}]^{2-}

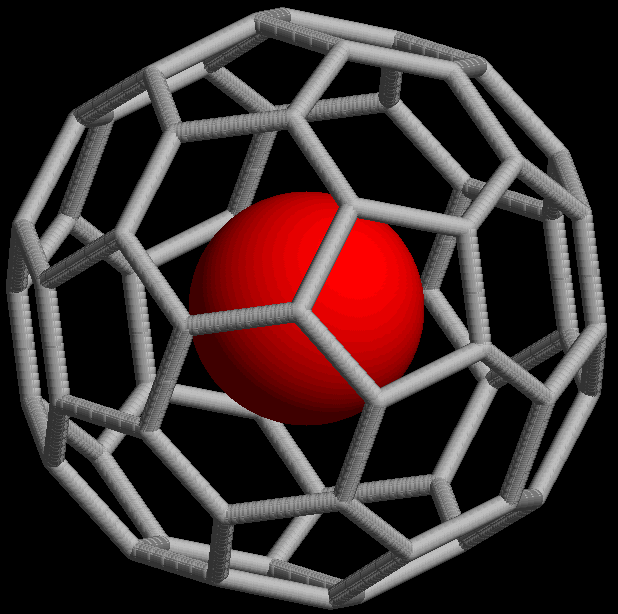
An atom or ion (red) held in a C_{60} fullerene cage

In magnetochemistry, double groups are needed in the treatment of the paramagnetism of complexes of metal ions with an odd number of electrons, and hence half-integer total angular momentum J. The simplest case is a single electron or a single vacancy ("hole") in the valence shell of the metal ion, as in the electronic configurations 3d^{1}, 3d^{9}, 4f^{1} and 4f^{13}; examples are the ions Ti^{3+} (3d^{1}), Cu^{2+} (3d^{9}), Ag^{2+} (4d^{9}), and Ce^{3+} (4f^{1}).

An example is the treatment of the magnetic properties of 6-coordinate complexes of copper(II). The electronic configuration of the central Cu^{2+} ion can be written as [Ar]3d^{9}. It can be said that there is a single vacancy, or hole, in the copper 3d-electron shell, which can contain up to 10 electrons. The ion [Cu(H_{2}O)_{6}]^{2+} is a typical example of a compound with this characteristic.

1. Six-coordinate complexes of the Cu(II) ion, with the generic formula [CuL_{6}]^{2+}, are subject to the Jahn–Teller effect so that the symmetry is reduced from octahedral (point group O_{h}) to tetragonal (point group D_{4h}). Since d orbitals are centrosymmetric the related atomic term symbols can be classified in the subgroup D_{4}.
2. To a first approximation spin–orbit coupling can be ignored and the magnetic moment is then predicted to be 1.73 Bohr magnetons, the so-called spin-only value. However, for a more accurate prediction spin–orbit coupling must be taken into consideration. This means that the relevant quantum number is J, where J = L + S.
3. With spin–orbit coupling, J is half-integer, and the electronic states must be classified in the double group D_{4}′.

With species such as the square-planar complex of the silver(II) ion [AgF_{4}]^{2−} the relevant double group is also D_{4}′; deviations from the spin-only value are greater as the magnitude of spin–orbit coupling is greater for silver(II) than for copper(II).

A double group is also used for some compounds of titanium in the +3 oxidation state. Titanium(III) has a single electron in the 3d shell; the magnetic moments of its complexes have been found to lie in the range 1.63–1.81 B.M. at room temperature. The double group O′ is used to classify their electronic states.

The cerium(III) ion, Ce^{3+}, has a single electron in the 4f shell. The magnetic properties of octahedral complexes of this ion are treated using the double group O′.

When a cerium(III) ion is encapsulated in a C_{60} cage, the formula of the endohedral fullerene is written as {Ce^{3+}@C_{60}^{3−}}. The magnetic properties of the compound are treated using the icosahedral double group I^{2}_{h}.

Double groups are also used for free radicals with a single unpaired electron, such as CH_{3}F^{+} and CH_{3}BF_{2}^{+}.
