= Loschmidt's paradox =

Conflict between known physical principles (time symmetry and entropy)

In physics, Loschmidt's paradox (named for Josef Loschmidt), also known as the reversibility paradox, irreversibility paradox, or Umkehreinwand (from German 'reversal objection'), is the objection that it should not be possible to deduce an irreversible process from time-symmetric dynamics. This puts the time reversal symmetry of (almost) all known low-level fundamental physical processes at odds with any attempt to infer from them the second law of thermodynamics, which describes the behaviour of macroscopic systems. Both of these are well-accepted principles in physics, with sound observational and theoretical support, yet they seem to be in conflict, hence the paradox.

== Origin ==
Josef Loschmidt's criticism was provoked by the H-theorem of Boltzmann, which employed kinetic theory to explain the increase of entropy in an ideal gas from a non-equilibrium state, when the molecules of the gas are allowed to collide. In 1876, Loschmidt pointed out that if there is a motion of a system from time t_{0} to time t_{1} to time t_{2} that leads to a steady decrease of H (increase of entropy) with time, then there is another allowed state of motion of the system at t_{1}, found by reversing all the velocities, in which H must increase. This revealed that one of Boltzmann's key assumptions, molecular chaos, or, the Stosszahlansatz, that all particle velocities were completely uncorrelated, did not follow from Newtonian dynamics.

Reversible laws of motion cannot explain why we experience our world to be in such a comparatively low state of entropy at the moment (compared to the equilibrium entropy of universal heat death); and to have been at even lower entropy in the past.

Later authors coined the term "Loschmitz's demon" (in analogy to Maxwell's demon, see below) for an entity that is able to reverse time evolution in a microscopic system, in their case of nuclear spins, which is indeed, if only for a short time, experimentally possible.

=== Before Loschmidt ===
In 1874, two years before the Loschmidt paper, William Thomson defended the second law against the time reversal objection in his paper "The kinetic theory of the dissipation of energy".

== Arrow of time ==
Any process that happens regularly in the forward direction of time but rarely or never in the opposite direction, such as entropy increasing in an isolated system, defines what physicists call an arrow of time in nature. This term only refers to an observation of an asymmetry in time; it is not meant to suggest an explanation for such asymmetries. Loschmidt's paradox is equivalent to the question of how it is possible that there could be a thermodynamic arrow of time given time-symmetric fundamental laws, since time-symmetry implies that for any process compatible with these fundamental laws, a reversed version that looked exactly like a film of the first process played backwards would be equally compatible with the same fundamental laws, and would even be equally probable if one were to pick the system's initial state randomly from the phase space of all possible states for that system.

Although most of the arrows of time described by physicists are thought to be special cases of the thermodynamic arrow, there are a few that are believed to be unconnected, like the cosmological arrow of time based on the fact that the universe is expanding rather than contracting, and the fact that a few processes in particle physics actually violate T-symmetry, while they respect a related symmetry known as CPT symmetry. In the case of the cosmological arrow, most physicists believe that entropy would continue to increase even if the universe began to contract (although the physicist Thomas Gold once proposed a model in which the thermodynamic arrow would reverse in this phase). In the case of the violations of time-symmetry in particle physics, the situations in which they occur are rare and are only known to involve a few types of meson particles. Furthermore, due to CPT symmetry, reversal of the direction of time is equivalent to renaming particles as antiparticles and vice versa. Therefore, this cannot explain Loschmidt's paradox.

== Dynamical systems ==
Current research in dynamical systems offers one possible mechanism for obtaining irreversibility from reversible systems. The central argument is based on the claim that the correct way to study the dynamics of macroscopic systems is to study the transfer operator corresponding to the microscopic equations of motion. It is then argued that the transfer operator is not unitary (i.e. is not reversible) but has eigenvalues whose magnitude is strictly less than one; these eigenvalues corresponding to decaying physical states. This approach is fraught with various difficulties; it works well for only a handful of exactly solvable models.

Abstract mathematical tools used in the study of dissipative systems include definitions of mixing, wandering sets, and ergodic theory in general.

== Fluctuation theorem ==
One approach to handling Loschmidt's paradox is the fluctuation theorem, derived heuristically by Denis Evans and Debra Searles, which gives a numerical estimate of the probability that a system away from equilibrium will have a certain value for the dissipation function (often an entropy like property) over a certain amount of time. The result is obtained with the exact time reversible dynamical equations of motion and the universal causation proposition. The fluctuation theorem is obtained using the fact that dynamics are time-reversible. Quantitative predictions of this theorem have been confirmed in laboratory experiments at the Australian National University conducted by Edith M. Sevick et al. using optical tweezers apparatus. This theorem is applicable for transient systems, which may initially be in equilibrium and then driven away (as was the case for the first experiment by Sevick et al.) or in some other arbitrary initial state, including relaxation towards equilibrium. There is also an asymptotic result for systems which are in a nonequilibrium steady state at all times.

There is a crucial point in the fluctuation theorem, that differs from how Loschmidt framed the paradox. Loschmidt considered the probability of observing a single trajectory, which is analogous to enquiring about the probability of observing a single point in phase space. In both of these cases the probability is always zero. To be able to effectively address this you must consider the probability density for a set of points in a small region of phase space, or a set of trajectories. The fluctuation theorem considers the probability density for all of the trajectories that are initially in an infinitesimally small region of phase space. This leads directly to the probability of finding a trajectory, in either the forward or the reverse trajectory sets, depending upon the initial probability distribution as well as the dissipation which is done as the system evolves. It is this crucial difference in approach that allows the fluctuation theorem to correctly solve the paradox.

== Information theory ==
A more recent proposal concentrates on the step of the paradox in which velocities are reversed. At that moment the gas becomes an open system, and in order to reverse the velocities, position and velocity measurements have to be made. Without this, no reversal is possible. These measurements are themselves either irreversible, or reversible. In the first case, they require an increase of entropy in the measuring device that will at least offset the decrease during the reversed evolution of the gas. In the second case, Landauer's principle can be invoked to reach the same conclusion. Hence, the gas+measuring device system obeys the Second Law of Thermodynamics. It is not a coincidence that this argument mirrors closely another one given by Bennett to explain away Maxwell’s demon. The difference is that the role of measurement is obvious in Maxwell’s demon, but not in Loschmidt’s paradox, which may explain the 40-year gap between both explanations. In the case of the single-trajectory paradox, this argument preempts the need for any other explanation, although some of them make valid points. The broader paradox, that “an irreversible process cannot be deduced from reversible dynamics,” is not covered by the argument given in this section.

== Big Bang ==
Another way of dealing with Loschmidt's paradox is to see the second law as an expression of a set of boundary conditions, in which our universe's time coordinate has a low-entropy starting point: the Big Bang. From this point of view, the arrow of time is determined entirely by the direction that leads away from the Big Bang, and a hypothetical universe with a maximum-entropy Big Bang would have no arrow of time. The theory of cosmic inflation tries to give reason why the early universe had such a low entropy.

== See also ==
- Maximum entropy thermodynamics for one particular perspective on entropy, reversibility and the Second Law
- Past hypothesis
- Poincaré recurrence theorem
- Reversibility
- Statistical mechanics
