= Denis Evans =

Australian scientist

Denis Evans AM FAA FRACI
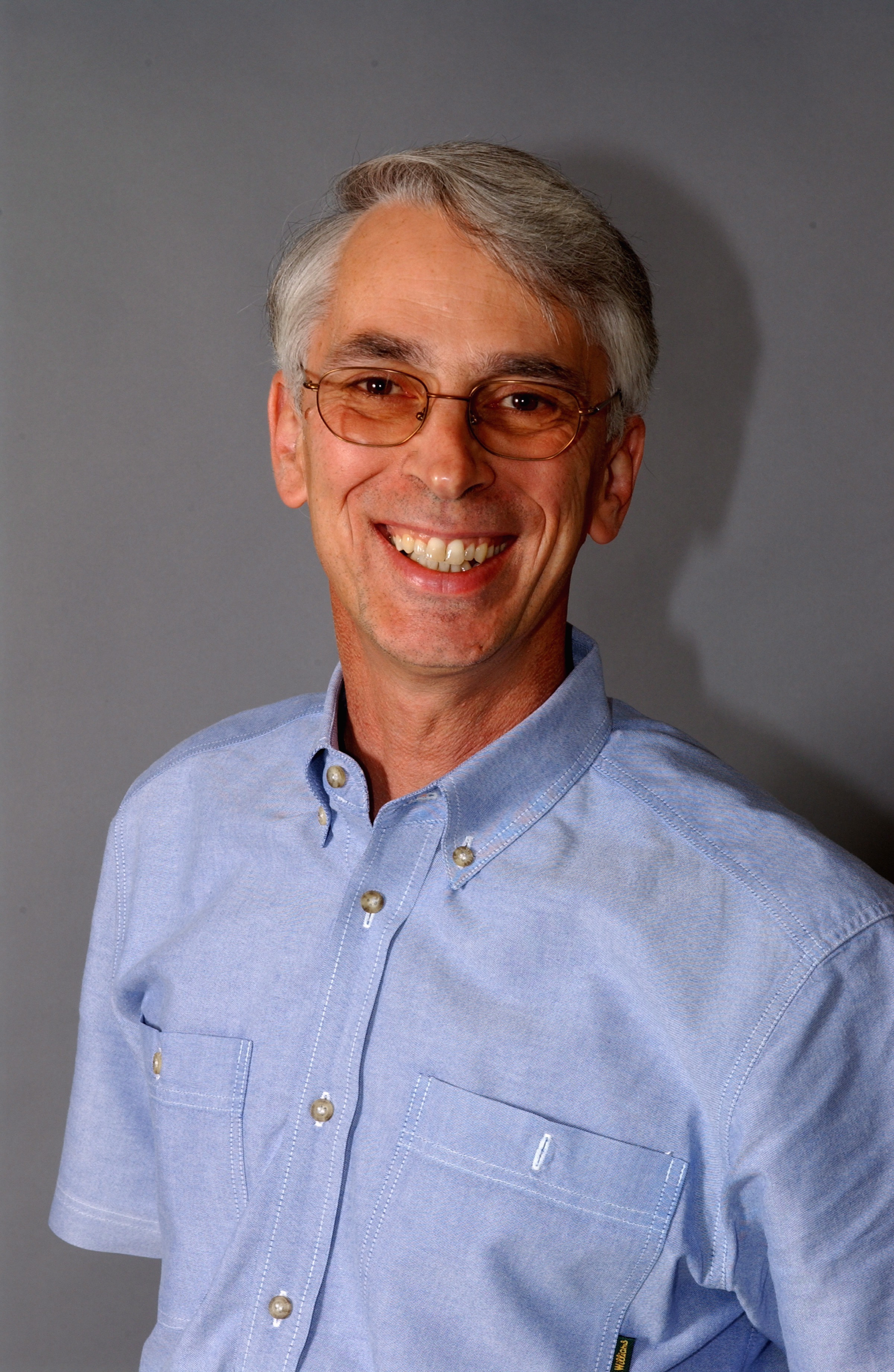
- Born: Denis James Evans; 19 April 1951 (age 75); Sydney, New South Wales, Australia
- Scientific career
- Fields: Physics; chemistry
- Workplaces: Australian National University

Denis James Evans (born 19 April 1951) is an Australian scientist who is an emeritus professor at the Australian National University and honorary professor at The University of Queensland. He is widely recognised for his contributions to nonequilibrium thermodynamics and nonequilibrium statistical mechanics and the simulation of nonequilibrium fluids.

== Career ==
Evans graduated with a BSc (Hons 1) in Physics from the University of Sydney in 1972 and a PhD from the Australian National University in 1975. He was a CSIRO Postdoctoral Fellow at the University of Oxford from 1976 to 1977, a Research Fellow at Cornell University from 1977 to 1978 and a Fulbright Fellow at the National Bureau of Standards (Boulder, Colorado, USA) during 1979 and 1980. Evans was appointed as Research Fellow in the Ion Diffusion Unit of the ANU Research School of Physics at the Australian National University in 1979 and joined the ANU Research School of Chemistry in 1982. He was Academic Director of the ANU Supercomputer Facility from 1989 to 1992, Dean of the ANU Research School of Chemistry from 1998 to 2007 and Convenor of the ANU College of Science from 2005 to 2007.

== Memberships, honours and awards ==
Evans was elected as a fellow of the Australian Academy of Science in 1994, was awarded a Centenary Medal from the Australian Government in 2000, and was appointed as a Member (AM) in the General Division of the Order of Australia in 2016.

Evans has won numerous awards, including the Rennie Memorial Medal of the Royal Australian Chemical Institute (1983), the Frederick White Medal of the Australian Academy of Science (1990), the H. G. Smith Medal of the Royal Australian Chemical Institute (2000), the Boys-Rahman Lectureship of the Royal Society of Chemistry (2000), the Moyal Medal for distinguished contributions to mathematics, physics or statistics of the Macquarie University (2004), the David Craig Medal and Lecture of the Australian Academy of Science (2015) and the Lennard-Jones Lectureship and Prize of the Royal Society of Chemistry (2019).

He is also a keen bushwalker and photographer.

== Research achievements ==
From 1989 to 2016 Evans was Professor of Chemistry and Leader of the Liquid State Chemical Physics group in the Research School of Chemistry at The Australian National University. He is now Emeritus Professor in the Department of Applied Mathematics at the ANU Research at the School Physics and Engineering, and a member of the ANU Energy Change Institute. Evans is best known for his contributions to the statistical mechanics of nonequilibrium systems including the derivation and experimental validation of the Fluctuation theorem which is an extension of the Second Law of Thermodynamics, and his development of algorithms for nonequilibrium molecular dynamics simulations.

Evans has over 350 publications on nonequilibrium statistical mechanics, dynamical systems theory as applied to bulk systems, irreversible thermodynamics, computer simulation algorithms for nonequilibrium systems, the relation of the intermolecular potential function to macroscopic fluid properties and molecular rheology. He has developed nonequilibrium simulation methods including the SLLOD algorithm for the study of shear flow, the Evans' method for heat flow, the colour conductivity method for the determination of self diffusion.

He is also well known for the development of links between the theory of chaos and properties of fluids including the development of the Conjugate Pairing Rule.

== Books ==
- Evans, D.J. and Morriss, G.P., "Statistical mechanics of nonequilibrium Liquids", First Edition reprinted, Australian National University ePress, Canberra, 2007, ISBN 978-1-921313-22-6.
- Evans D.J., Searles D.J. and Williams S.R. "Fundamentals of Classical Statistical Thermodynamics: Dissipation, Relaxation and Fluctuation Theorems", pp205. (Wiley VCH, Weinheim Germany) ISBN 978-3527410736
- Evans D.J. and Morriss G.P., "Statistical mechanics of nonequilibrium Liquids", Second Edition, (Cambridge University Press, Cambridge), ISBN 978-0521857918

== Selected publications ==
- Williams, Stephen R.; Evans, Denis J. (6 January 2006). "Linear Response Domain in Glassy Systems". Physical Review Letters. 96 (1) 015701. American Physical Society (APS). Bibcode:2006PhRvL..96a5701W. doi:10.1103/physrevlett.96.015701. ISSN 0031-9007. PMID 16486474.
- Wang, G. M.; Sevick, E. M.; Mittag, Emil; Searles, Debra J.; Evans, Denis J. (15 July 2002). "Experimental Demonstration of Violations of the Second Law of Thermodynamics for Small Systems and Short Time Scales" (PDF). Physical Review Letters. 89 (5) 050601. American Physical Society (APS). Bibcode:2002PhRvL..89e0601W. doi:10.1103/physrevlett.89.050601. hdl:10440/854. ISSN 0031-9007. PMID 12144431.
- Evans, Denis J.; Searles, Debra J. (2002). "The Fluctuation Theorem". Advances in Physics. 51 (7). Informa UK Limited: 1529–1585. Bibcode:2002AdPhy..51.1529E. doi:10.1080/00018730210155133. ISSN 0001-8732. S2CID 10308868.
- Lue, L.; Evans, D. J. (1 October 2000). "Configurational temperature for systems with constraints". Physical Review E. 62 (4). American Physical Society (APS): 4764–4768. Bibcode:2000PhRvE..62.4764L. doi:10.1103/physreve.62.4764. ISSN 1063-651X. PMID 11089019.
- Butler, B. D.; Ayton, Gary; Jepps, Owen G.; Evans, Denis J. (22 October 1998). "Configurational temperature: Verification of Monte Carlo simulations". The Journal of Chemical Physics. 109 (16). AIP Publishing: 6519–6522. Bibcode:1998JChPh.109.6519B. doi:10.1063/1.477301. hdl:1885/40712. ISSN 0021-9606.
- Evans, Denis J.; Cohen, E.G.D.; Morriss, Gary P. (1993). "Probability of second law violations in shearing steady states". Physical Review Letters. 71 (15). American Physical Society (APS): 2401–2404. Bibcode:1993PhRvL..71.2401E. doi:10.1103/PhysRevLett.71.2401. hdl:1959.4/unsworks_41329. ISSN 0031-9007. PMID 10054671.
- Evans, Denis J.; Morriss, Gary P. (1984). "Non-Newtonian molecular dynamics". Computer Physics Reports. 1 (16). North-Holland: 297-343. Bibcode:1984CoPhR...1..297E. doi:10.1016/0167-7977(84)90001-7. ISSN 0167-7977.

== See also ==
- Fluctuation theorem
- Loschmidt's paradox – how can one reconcile thermodynamic irreversibility with the time reversibility inherent in the microscopic equations of motion for both classical and quantum mechanical systems
- Le Chatelier's principle – a nineteenth-century principle that defied a mathematical proof until the advent of the Fluctuation Theorem.
- Crooks fluctuation theorem – an example of transient fluctuation theorem relating the dissipated work in nonequilibrium transformations to free energy differences.
- Jarzynski equality – another nonequilibrium equality closely related to the fluctuation theorem and to the second law of thermodynamics
- Green-Kubo relations – there is a deep connection between the fluctuation theorem and the Green-Kubo relations for linear transport coefficients – like shear viscosity or thermal conductivity
- Boltzmann
- Thermodynamics
- Brownian motor
