= Nonequilibrium partition identity =

The nonequilibrium partition identity (NPI) is a remarkably simple and elegant consequence of the fluctuation theorem previously known as the Kawasaki identity:

$$\left\langle {\exp [ - \overline \Sigma_t \; t ]} \right\rangle  = 1,\quad \forall t$$

(Carberry et al. 2004). Thus in spite of the second law inequality which might lead one to expect that the average would decay exponentially with time, the exponential probability ratio given by the FT exactly cancels the negative exponential in the average above leading to an average which is unity for all time.

The first derivation of the nonequilibrium partition identity for Hamiltonian systems was by Yamada and Kawasaki in 1967. For thermostatted deterministic systems the first derivation was by Morriss and Evans in 1985.

== Bibliography ==
- Kawasaki, Kyozi; Gunton, James D. (1973-10-01). "Theory of Nonlinear Transport Processes: Nonlinear Shear Viscosity and Normal Stress Effects". Physical Review A. 8 (4). American Physical Society (APS): 2048–2064. Bibcode:1973PhRvA...8.2048K. doi:10.1103/physreva.8.2048. ISSN 0556-2791.
- Yamada, Tomoji; Kawasaki, Kyozi (1967). "Nonlinear Effects in the Shear Viscosity of Critical Mixtures". Progress of Theoretical Physics. 38 (5). Oxford University Press (OUP): 1031–1051. Bibcode:1967PThPh..38.1031Y. doi:10.1143/ptp.38.1031. ISSN 0033-068X.
- Morriss, G.P.; Evans, Denis J. (1985-02-20). "Isothermal response theory". Molecular Physics. 54 (3). Informa UK Limited: 629–636. Bibcode:1985MolPh..54..629M. doi:10.1080/00268978500100481. ISSN 0026-8976.
- Carberry, D. M.; Williams, S. R.; Wang, G. M.; Sevick, E. M.; Evans, Denis J. (2004). "The Kawasaki identity and the Fluctuation Theorem" (PDF). The Journal of Chemical Physics. 121 (17). AIP Publishing: 8179–82. Bibcode:2004JChPh.121.8179C. doi:10.1063/1.1802211. hdl:1885/15803. ISSN 0021-9606. PMID 15511135.

== See also ==
- Fluctuation theorem – Provides an equality that quantifies fluctuations in time averaged entropy production in a wide variety of nonequilibrium systems
- Crooks fluctuation theorem – Provides a fluctuation theorem between two equilibrium states; implies the Jarzynski equality
