= Christopher Jarzynski =

American physicist (born 1965)

- Born: November 23, 1965 (age 60); Washington, D.C.
- Education: Princeton University; University of California, Berkeley
- Known for: Jarzynski equality
- Awards: Sackler Prize; Onsager Prize; American Physical Society Fellow; American Academy of Arts and Sciences Fellow; Simons Fellow; Guggenheim Fellow; Member of the National Academy of Sciences
- Scientific career
- Doctoral advisor: Władysław J. Świątecki; Robert Grayson Littlejohn
- Website: http://www.chem.umd.edu/faculty-staff-directory/facultydirectory/christopher-jarzynski

Christopher Jarzynski is an American physicist and distinguished university professor at University of Maryland's department of chemistry and biochemistry, department of physics, and institute for physical science and technology, and fellow of the National Academy of Sciences. He is known for his contributions to non-equilibrium thermodynamics and statistical mechanics, for which he was awarded the 2019 Lars Onsager Prize. In 1997, he derived the now famous Jarzynski equality, confirmation of which was cited by the Nobel Committee for Physics as an application of one of the winning inventions of the 2018 Nobel Prize in physics—optical tweezers.

== Education and research ==
Jarzynski graduated from Our Lady of Good Counsel High School in Wheaton, Maryland in 1983. He then attended Princeton University from where he graduated with high honors with an A.B. in physics in 1987 after completing a senior thesis titled "An experimental search for 1.7 MEV axions in nuclear decays, 'the detector from hell'." He received his Ph.D. in physics in 1994 from University of California, Berkeley, under the supervision of Władysław J. Świątecki and Robert Grayson Littlejohn.

At University of California, Berkeley, Jarzynski studied adiabatic invariants in chaotic classical systems. After graduating with a PhD, he spent ten years at Los Alamos National Laboratory, and since 2006 he has been faculty at the University of Maryland, College Park. His research is primarily in the area of non-equilibrium statistical mechanics, where he has contributed to an understanding of how the laws of thermodynamics apply to nanoscale systems. In 1997, he derived an equality, now known as the Jarzynski equality, that relates nonequilibrium fluctuations to equilibrium free energy differences, a result that has been verified in numerous experiments and has found applications in biophysics and computational chemistry. His current interests also include the thermodynamics of information processing, as well as shortcuts to adiabaticity in quantum, classical and stochastic systems.

== Awards and honours ==
He has been the recipient of a Fulbright Fellowship, the Sackler Prize in the Physical Sciences, and the 2019 Lars Onsager Prize. He is a fellow of the American Physical Society and the American Academy of Arts and Sciences. In 2020 he was elected to the National Academy of Sciences and awarded a Guggenheim Fellowship and Simons Fellowship.

Jarzynski is a member of the editorial board of the Journal of Statistical Mechanics: Theory and Experiment, and an associate editor of the Journal of Statistical Physics.
