= Kramers' theorem =

Theorem in quantum mechanics

In quantum mechanics, Kramers' theorem or Kramers' degeneracy theorem states that for every energy eigenstate of a time-reversal symmetric system with half-integer total spin, there is another eigenstate with the same energy related by time-reversal. In other words, the degeneracy of every energy level is an even number if it has half-integer spin. The theorem is named after Dutch physicist H. A. Kramers.

In theoretical physics, the time reversal symmetry is the symmetry of physical laws under a time reversal transformation:

$$T: t \mapsto -t.$$

If the Hamiltonian operator commutes with the time-reversal operator, that is

$$[H,T]=0,$$

then, for every energy eigenstate $|n\rangle$, the time reversed state $T|n\rangle$ is also an eigenstate with the same energy. These two states are sometimes called a Kramers pair. In general, this time-reversed state may be identical to the original one, but that is not possible in a half-integer spin system: since time reversal reverses all angular momenta, reversing a half-integer spin cannot yield the same state (the magnetic quantum number is never zero).

== Mathematical statement and proof ==
In quantum mechanics, the time reversal operation is represented by an antiunitary operator $T : \mathcal{H} \to \mathcal{H}$ acting on a Hilbert space $\mathcal{H}$. If it happens that $T^2 = -1$, then we have the following simple theorem:

If $T : \mathcal{H} \to \mathcal{H}$ is an antiunitary operator acting on a Hilbert space $\mathcal{H}$ satisfying $T^2 = -1$ and $v$ a vector in $\mathcal{H}$, then $T v$ is orthogonal to $v$.

=== Proof ===
By the definition of an antiunitary operator, $\langle T u, T w \rangle = \langle w, u \rangle$, where $u$ and $w$ are vectors in $\mathcal{H}$. Replacing $u = T v$ and $w = v$ and using that $T^2 = -1$, we get $\langle T^2 v, T v \rangle = - \langle v, T v \rangle = \langle v, T v \rangle$, which implies that $\langle v, T v \rangle = 0$.

Consequently, if a Hamiltonian $H$ is time-reversal symmetric, i.e., it commutes with $T,$ then all its energy eigenspaces have even degeneracy, since applying $T$ to an arbitrary energy eigenstate $|n\rangle$ gives another energy eigenstate $T | n \rangle$ that is orthogonal to the first one. The orthogonality property is crucial, as it means that the two eigenstates $| n \rangle$ and $T | n \rangle$ represent different physical states. If, on the contrary, they were the same physical state, then $T |n\rangle = e^{i \alpha} |n\rangle$ for an angle $\alpha \in \mathbb{R}$, which would imply

$$T^2 |n\rangle = T (e^{i \alpha} |n\rangle) = e^{- i \alpha} e^{i \alpha} |n \rangle = |n \rangle$$

To complete Kramers degeneracy theorem, we just need to prove that the time-reversal operator $T$ acting on a half-odd-integer spin Hilbert space satisfies $T^2 = -1$. This follows from the fact that the spin operator $\mathbf{S}$ represents a type of angular momentum, and, as such, should reverse direction under $T$:

$$\mathbf{S} \to T^{-1} \mathbf{S} T = - \mathbf{S}.$$

Concretely, an operator $T$ that has this property is usually written as

$$T = e^{- i \pi S_y} K$$

where $S_y$ is the spin operator in the $y$ direction and $K$ is the complex conjugation map in the $S_z$ spin basis.

Since $i S_y$ has real matrix components in the $S_z$ basis, then

$$T^2 = e^{- i \pi S_y} K e^{- i \pi S_y} K = e^{- i 2 \pi S_y} K^2 = (-1)^{2 S}.$$

Hence, for half-odd-integer spins $S = \frac{1}{2}, \frac{3}{2}, \ldots$, we have $T^2 = -1$. This is the same minus sign that appears when one does a full $2 \pi$ rotation on systems with half-odd-integer spins, such as fermions.

== Consequences ==
The energy levels of a system with an odd total number of fermions (such as electrons, protons and neutrons) remain at least doubly degenerate in the presence of purely electric fields (i.e. no external magnetic fields). It was first discovered in 1930 by H. A. Kramers as a consequence of the Breit equation. As shown by Eugene Wigner in 1932. It is a consequence of the time reversal invariance of electric fields, and follows from an application of the antiunitary T-operator to the wavefunction of an odd number of fermions. The theorem is valid for any configuration of static or time-varying electric fields.

For example, the hydrogen (H) atom contains one proton and one electron, so that the Kramers theorem does not apply. Indeed, the lowest (hyperfine) energy level of H is nondegenerate, although a generic system might have degeneracy for other reasons. The deuterium (D) isotope on the other hand contains an extra neutron, so that the total number of fermions is three, and the theorem does apply. The ground state of D contains two hyperfine components, which are twofold and fourfold degenerate.

== See also ==
- Degeneracy
- T-symmetry
