= Gavin E. Crooks =

English chemist

Gavin Earl Crooks
- Education: University of East Anglia; University of California, Berkeley
- Known for: Crooks fluctuation theorem
- Scientific career
- Fields: Statistical mechanics
- Workplaces: Lawrence Berkeley National Lab
- Thesis: Excursions in Statistical Dynamics (1999)
- Doctoral advisor: David Chandler
- Website: Personal homepage

Gavin Earl Crooks is known for his work on non-equilibrium thermodynamics and statistical mechanics. He discovered the Crooks fluctuation theorem, a general statement about the free energy difference between the initial and final states of a non-equilibrium transformation.

== Career ==
Crooks received his B.Sc. in chemistry from the University of East Anglia in 1992 and his M.Sc. in Biocolloid Chemistry from the same university in 1993. His master's advisor was R. H. Robinson, and his thesis was entitled "Characterization of Lipases in Water-in-Oil Microemulsions". He earned his Ph.D. at the University of California, Berkeley under David Chandler in 1999. During this time, he explored both equilibrium and nonequilibrium statistical mechanics. He did significant work on transition path sampling as well as nonequilibrium statistical mechanics. He briefly left science to work for an internet startup doughtnet.com, but he later returned to theoretical chemistry, accepting a postdoctoral fellowship with the Computational Genomics Research Group led by Steven Brenner. Crooks was a senior research scientist at Rigetti Computing.

He was awarded a Presidential Early Career Award for Scientists and Engineers in 2009.

He has an h-index of 45 according to Google Scholar.
