= CryoEDM =

CryoEDM is a particle physics experiment aiming to measure the electric dipole moment (EDM) of the neutron to a precision of ~10^{−28}ecm. The name is an abbreviation of cryogenic neutron EDM experiment. The previous name nEDM is also sometimes used, but should be avoided where there may be ambiguity. The project follows the Sussex/RAL/ILL nEDM experiment, which set the current best upper limit of 2.9×10^{−26}ecm. To reach the improved sensitivity, cryoEDM uses a new source of ultracold neutrons (UCN), which works by scattering cold neutrons in superfluid helium.

The experiment is located at the Institut Laue–Langevin in Grenoble. The collaboration includes the nEDM team from Sussex University and RAL, as well as new collaborators from Oxford, and Kure, Japan. The collaboration is remarkably small for a modern particle physics experiment (around 30 people).

In 2008 the experiment was ranked as an alpha 5 (top priority) project by STFC, together with the much larger CERN experiments: ATLAS and CMS.

== The neutron electric dipole moment ==
For more information see Neutron electric dipole moment

Although electrically neutral overall, the neutron is made up of charged quarks. An imbalance of charge on one side would cause a non-zero EDM. This would be a violation of parity (P) and time reversal (T) symmetries. A neutron EDM is believed to exist at some level to explain the matter-antimatter asymmetry of the Universe, although to date every measurement has given a value consistent with zero.

Limits on the neutron EDM are a significant constraint on many particle physics theories. The Standard Model of Particle Physics predicts a value 10^{−31} – 10^{−32} ecm, while supersymmetric theories predict values in the range 10^{−25} – 10^{−28}ecm.

== Measurement principle ==
Modern EDM experiments work by measuring a shift in the neutron Larmor spin precession frequency $\nu$, when the applied electric field E is reversed. This is given by

$h\nu=2dE\pm2\mu B$

where d is the EDM, $\mu$ is the magnetic dipole moment, B is the magnetic field, and h is the Planck constant, (the $\pm$ depends on whether the fields are parallel or antiparallel). Clearly when the electric field is reversed, this produces a shift in the precession frequency proportional to the EDM. As the neutron magnetic dipole moment is non-zero it is necessary to shield or correct for magnetic field fluctuations to avoid a false positive signal.

The precession frequency is measured using the Ramsey separated oscillatory field magnetic resonance method, in which a large number of spin polarized ultra-cold neutrons are stored in an electric and magnetic field. An AC magnetic field pulse is then applied to rotate the spins by $\pi/2$. The signal generator used to apply the pulse is then gated off while the neutron spins precess about the magnetic field axis at the precession frequency; after a period of ~100s, another field pulse is applied to rotate the spins by $\pi/2$. If the frequency of the applied signal is exactly equal to the precession frequency, the neutrons will all be synchronised with the signal generator, and they will all end up polarized in the opposite direction to how they started. If there is a difference between these two frequencies, then some neutrons will end up back in their original state. The number of neutrons in each polarization state is then counted and by plotting this number against the applied frequency, the precession frequency can be determined.

== The Sussex/RAL/ILL neutron EDM experiment (nEDM) ==
The nEDM experiment was a room temperature neutron EDM experiment which ran at ILL, using ultra-cold neutrons from the ILL reactor. Magnetic field fluctuations (a significant source of systematic error) were monitored using atomic mercury magnetometer. The results of the measurement were published in 1999 giving an upper limit on the neutron EDM of 6.3×10^{−26}ecm. A further analysis published in 2006 improved this to 2.9×10^{−26}ecm

== CryoEDM ==
The cryoEDM experiment is designed to improve the sensitivity of the nEDM experiment by two orders of magnitude down to ~10^{−28}ecm. This will be achieved by a number of factors: the number of UCN will be increased using a new source, in which a beam of cold neutrons is downscattered inside superfluid helium; the use of liquid helium instead of vacuum will allow the applied electric field to be increased; improvements to the apparatus will increase the possible storage time and polarization product. Moving from a room temperature to a cryogenic measurement, means it has been necessary to rebuild the entire apparatus. The new experiment uses superconducting lead magnetic shields, and a SQUID magnetometer system.

The experiment finished construction and was able to operate for a few years at ILL. The experiment achieved a number of accomplishments: multiple operations of cryostat at 0.6 K (300 L superfluid He volume), superthermal UCN production at expected rate, demonstrated transport to Ramsey Chamber and detectors, development/operation of solid-state UCN detectors in LHe, as well as installation and operation of SQUID magnetometry system.

However, in December 2013 STFC's Science Board decided to perform a “managed withdrawal” from CryoEDM, due to scale of program required to reach a new physics result in a competitive timescale outside of anticipated available resource levels. The experiment is now finished as of 2014.

== See also ==
- Neutron electric dipole moment
