= Green–Kubo relations =

Equation relating transport coefficients to correlation functions

The Green–Kubo relations, give the exact mathematical expression for a transport coefficient $\gamma$ in terms of the integral of the equilibrium time correlation function of the time derivative of a corresponding microscopic variable $A$ (sometimes termed a "gross variable"):

$$\gamma = C \int_0^\infty \left\langle \dot{A}(t) \dot{A}(0) \right\rangle \;{\mathrm d}t,$$

where the angle brackets denote an average over an equilibrium ensemble, and $C$ is a prefactor that depends on the transport coefficient; typically, it contains the inverse temperature and the system volume (see Examples).

The relations are named after the work of Melville S. Green in 1954, and of Ryogo Kubo 1957.

One intuitive way to understand this relation is that relaxations resulting from random fluctuations in equilibrium are indistinguishable from those due to an external perturbation in linear response.

Green-Kubo relations are important because they relate a macroscopic transport coefficient to the correlation function of a microscopic variable. In addition, they allow one to measure the transport coefficient without perturbing the system out of equilibrium, which has found much use in molecular dynamics simulations.

== Thermal and mechanical transport processes ==
Thermodynamic systems may be prevented from relaxing to equilibrium because of the application of a field (e.g. electric or magnetic field), or because the boundaries of the system are in relative motion (shear) or maintained at different temperatures, etc. This generates two classes of nonequilibrium system: mechanical nonequilibrium systems and thermal nonequilibrium systems.

The standard example of an electrical transport process is Ohm's law, which states that, at least for sufficiently small applied voltages, the current I is linearly proportional to the applied voltage V,

$$I = G V,$$

As the applied voltage increases one expects to see deviations from linear behavior. The coefficient of proportionality is the electrical conductance which is the reciprocal of the electrical resistance.

The standard example of a mechanical transport process is Newton's law of viscosity, which states that the shear stress $S_{xy}$ is linearly proportional to the strain rate. The strain rate $\dot\gamma$ is the rate of change streaming velocity in the x-direction, with respect to the y-coordinate, $\dot\gamma \mathrel\stackrel{\mathrm{def}}{=} \partial u_x /\partial y$. Newton's law of viscosity states

$$S_{xy}  = \eta \dot\gamma.\,$$

As the strain rate increases we expect to see deviations from linear behavior

$$S_{xy}  = \eta (\dot\gamma )\dot\gamma.\,$$

Another well known thermal transport process is Fourier's law of heat conduction, stating that the heat flux between two bodies maintained at different temperatures is proportional to the temperature gradient (the temperature difference divided by the spatial separation).

== Linear constitutive relation ==
Regardless of whether transport processes are stimulated thermally or mechanically, in the small field limit it is expected that a flux will be linearly proportional to an applied field. In the linear case the flux and the force are said to be conjugate to each other. The relation between a thermodynamic force F and its conjugate thermodynamic flux J is called a linear constitutive relation,

$$J = L(F_e{=}0) \, F_e.$$

L(0) is called a linear transport coefficient. In the case of multiple forces and fluxes acting simultaneously, the fluxes and forces will be related by a linear transport coefficient matrix. Except in special cases, this matrix is symmetric as expressed in the Onsager reciprocal relations.

In the 1950s Green and Kubo proved an exact expression for linear transport coefficients which is valid for systems of arbitrary temperature T, and density. They proved that linear transport coefficients are exactly related to the time dependence of equilibrium fluctuations in the conjugate flux,

$$L(F_e{=}0) = \beta V\;\int_0^\infty  {\mathrm d}s \, \left\langle J(0)J(s) \right\rangle _{F_e  = 0},$$

where $\beta = \frac{1}{kT}$ (with k the Boltzmann constant), and V is the system volume. The integral is over the equilibrium flux autocovariance function. At zero time the autocovariance is positive since it is the mean square value of the flux at equilibrium. Note that at equilibrium the mean value of the flux is zero by definition. At long times the flux at time t, J(t), is uncorrelated with its value a long time earlier J(0) and the autocorrelation function decays to zero. This remarkable relation is frequently used in molecular dynamics computer simulation to compute linear transport coefficients.

== Examples ==
Consider a fluid of N particles with mass m, positions $\mathbf{r}_i$, velocities $\mathbf{v}_i$ and charges $q_i$ in a volume V at temperature T, and let $\mathbf{F}_{ij}$ be the force exerted on particle i by particle j. The Green–Kubo relations for the most common transport coefficients are:

- the self-diffusion coefficient

$$D = \frac{1}{3}\int_0^\infty \left\langle \mathbf{v}_i(t)\cdot\mathbf{v}_i(0)\right\rangle {\mathrm d}t,$$

in practice averaged over all particles i;

- the shear viscosity

$$\eta = \frac{V}{k_\text{B}T}\int_0^\infty \left\langle P_{xy}(t)\,P_{xy}(0)\right\rangle {\mathrm d}t,$$

where $P_{xy}$ is an off-diagonal element of the microscopic pressure tensor,

$$P_{xy} = \frac{1}{V}\left(\sum_i m\,v_{i,x}v_{i,y} + \sum_{i<j}(x_i-x_j)\,F_{ij,y}\right);$$

- the thermal conductivity

$$\lambda = \frac{V}{k_\text{B}T^2}\int_0^\infty \left\langle J^\text{e}_x(t)\,J^\text{e}_x(0)\right\rangle {\mathrm d}t,$$

where $\mathbf{J}^\text{e}$ is the microscopic energy current density (heat flux);

- the electrical conductivity

$$\sigma = \frac{1}{3Vk_\text{B}T}\int_0^\infty \left\langle \mathbf{J}(t)\cdot\mathbf{J}(0)\right\rangle {\mathrm d}t,$$

where $\mathbf{J} = \sum_i q_i\mathbf{v}_i$ is the total charge current.

Except for the self-diffusion coefficient, these are instances of the general formula for $L(F_e{=}0)$ given above; the extra factor $1/T$ in the thermal conductivity arises because the force conjugate to the heat flux is the gradient of $1/T$.

== Einstein–Helfand relations ==
For a stationary process, the mean squared increment of A can be written as
$$\left\langle \left[A(t)-A(0)\right]^2 \right\rangle = 2\int_0^t (t-s) \left\langle \dot{A}(s) \dot{A}(0) \right\rangle {\mathrm d}s.$$
Therefore, whenever the Green–Kubo integral converges, it can be replaced by the equivalent expression
$$\gamma = C \lim_{t\to\infty} \frac{1}{2t} \left\langle \left[A(t)-A(0)\right]^2 \right\rangle.$$
For self-diffusion, this is the Einstein relation $\left\langle |\mathbf{r}_i(t)-\mathbf{r}_i(0)|^2 \right\rangle \simeq 6Dt$. Eugene Helfand derived the corresponding expressions for the other transport coefficients; for instance, the shear viscosity is given by the mean squared displacement of the "center of momentum" $G = \sum_i m\,x_i v_{i,y}$, whose time derivative is $VP_{xy}$:
$$\eta = \lim_{t\to\infty} \frac{1}{2tVk_\text{B}T} \left\langle \left[G(t)-G(0)\right]^2 \right\rangle.$$

== Conditions of validity ==
The Green–Kubo relations hold only under conditions that are often left implicit:

- The flux $\dot{A}$ must have zero equilibrium average; otherwise the integral diverges. Where necessary, the average is subtracted, as for the pressure fluctuation $P-\langle P\rangle$ in the Green–Kubo relation for the bulk viscosity.
- If the flux contains a conserved component, its correlation function does not decay. In a one-component fluid, for instance, the mass current is the total momentum, which is conserved, and therefore there is no Green–Kubo relation for collective mass diffusion.
- The thermodynamic limit must be taken before the limit $t\to\infty$. In a finite closed system, a quantity like a particle position is bounded, and the Einstein–Helfand form then shows that the transport coefficient vanishes. In computer simulations with periodic boundary conditions, the running integral $\int_0^t$ is evaluated up to a plateau, and the results depend on the box size L; for the self-diffusion coefficient, the leading correction is proportional to $k_\text{B}T/(\eta L)$.
- The correlation functions must decay fast enough for the integral to converge. Computer simulations by Alder and Wainwright showed that the velocity autocorrelation function decays asymptotically as $t^{-d/2}$ in d dimensions, which was explained by kinetic theory and by hydrodynamic mode coupling. Similar long-time tails occur in the autocorrelation functions of the other fluxes. In three dimensions, the Green–Kubo integrals converge. In two dimensions, they diverge logarithmically, so that the transport coefficients of a two-dimensional fluid do not exist.

== Nonlinear response and transient time correlation functions ==
In 1985 Denis Evans and Morriss derived two exact fluctuation expressions for nonlinear transport coefficients. Evans later argued that these are consequences of the extremization of free energy.

Evans and Morriss proved that in a thermostatted system that is at equilibrium at t = 0, the nonlinear transport coefficient can be calculated from the so-called transient time correlation function expression:

$$L(F_e ) = \beta V\;\int_0^\infty {\mathrm d}s \, \left\langle J(0)J(s) \right\rangle_{F_e},$$

where the equilibrium ($F_e = 0$) flux autocorrelation function is replaced by a thermostatted field dependent transient autocorrelation function. At time zero $\left\langle J(0) \right\rangle_{F_e} = 0$ but at later times since the field is applied $\left\langle J(t) \right\rangle_{F_e} \ne 0$.

Another exact fluctuation expression derived by Evans and Morriss is the so-called Kawasaki expression for the nonlinear response:

$$\left\langle J(t;F_e ) \right\rangle  = \left\langle J(0)\exp \left[ -\beta V\int_0^t J(-s)F_e \, {\mathrm d}s \right] \right\rangle _{F_e}.
\,$$

The ensemble average of the right hand side of the Kawasaki expression is to be evaluated under the application of both the thermostat and the external field. At first sight the transient time correlation function (TTCF) and Kawasaki expression might appear to be of limited use—because of their innate complexity. However, the TTCF is quite useful in computer simulations for calculating transport coefficients. Both expressions can be used to derive new and useful fluctuation expressions for quantities like specific heats in nonequilibrium steady states. Thus they can be used as a kind of partition function for nonequilibrium steady states.

== Derivation from the fluctuation theorem and the central limit theorem ==
For a thermostatted steady state, time integrals of the dissipation function are related to the dissipative flux, J, by the equation

$$\bar \Omega _t  =  - \beta \overline J _t VF_e.\,$$

We note in passing that the long time average of the dissipation function is a product of the thermodynamic force and the average conjugate thermodynamic flux. It is therefore equal to the spontaneous entropy production in the system. The spontaneous entropy production plays a key role in linear irreversible thermodynamics – see de Groot and Mazur.

The fluctuation theorem (FT) is valid for arbitrary averaging times, t. Let's apply the FT in the long time limit while simultaneously reducing the field so that the product $F_e^2 t$ is held constant,

$$\lim_{t \to \infty \atop F_e \to 0} \frac{1}{t} \ln \left( \frac{p{\left(\beta \overline J _t = A\right)}}{p{\left(\beta \overline J_t = -A\right)}} \right) =  -\lim_{t \to \infty \atop F_e  \to 0} AVF_e,\quad F_e^2 t = c.$$

Because of the particular way we take the double limit, the negative of the mean value of the flux remains a fixed number of standard deviations away from the mean as the averaging time increases (narrowing the distribution) and the field decreases. This means that as the averaging time gets longer the distribution near the mean flux and its negative, is accurately described by the central limit theorem. This means that the distribution is Gaussian near the mean and its negative so that

$$\lim_{t \to \infty \atop F_e  \to 0} \frac{1}{t} \ln \left( \frac{p{\left(\overline J _t = A\right)}}{p{\left(\overline J _t = -A\right)}} \right) = \lim_{t \to \infty \atop F_e  \to 0} \frac{2A\left\langle J \right\rangle_{F_e}}{t\sigma_{\overline J (t)}^2 }.$$

Combining these two relations yields (after some tedious algebra!) the exact Green–Kubo relation for the linear zero field transport coefficient, namely,

$$L(0) = \beta V\;\int_0^\infty {\mathrm d}t \, \left\langle J(0)J(t) \right\rangle_{F_e = 0}.$$

Here are the details of the proof of Green–Kubo relations from the FT. A proof using only elementary quantum mechanics was given by Robert Zwanzig.

== Summary ==
This shows the fundamental importance of the fluctuation theorem (FT) in nonequilibrium statistical mechanics. The FT gives a generalisation of the second law of thermodynamics. It is then easy to prove the second law inequality and the Kawasaki identity. When combined with the central limit theorem, the FT also implies the Green–Kubo relations for linear transport coefficients close to equilibrium. The FT is, however, more general than the Green–Kubo Relations because, unlike them, the FT applies to fluctuations far from equilibrium. In spite of this fact, no one has yet been able to derive the equations for nonlinear response theory from the FT.

The FT does not imply or require that the distribution of time-averaged dissipation is Gaussian. There are many examples known when the distribution is non-Gaussian and yet the FT still correctly describes the probability ratios.

== See also ==
- Density matrix
- Fluctuation theorem
- Fluctuation–dissipation theorem
- Green's function (many-body theory)
- Lindblad equation
- Linear response function
