= Transport coefficient =

A transport coefficient $\gamma$ measures how rapidly a perturbed system returns to equilibrium.

The transport coefficients occur in transport phenomenon with transport laws

$$\mathbf{J}_k = \gamma_k \mathbf{X}_k$$

where:

$\mathbf{J}_k$ is a flux of the property $k$
the transport coefficient $\gamma _k$ of this property $k$
$\mathbf{X}_k$, the gradient force which acts on the property $k$.

Transport coefficients can be expressed via a Green–Kubo relation:

$$\gamma = \int_0^\infty \left\langle \dot{A}(t) \dot{A}(0) \right\rangle \, dt,$$

where $A$ is an observable occurring in a perturbed Hamiltonian, $\langle \cdot \rangle$ is an ensemble average and the dot above the A denotes the time derivative. For times $t$ that are greater than the correlation time of the fluctuations of the observable the transport coefficient obeys a generalized Einstein relation:

$$2t\gamma = \left\langle |A(t) - A(0)|^2 \right\rangle.$$

In general a transport coefficient is a tensor.

== Examples ==
- Diffusion constant, relates the flux of particles with the negative gradient of the concentration (see Fick's laws of diffusion)
- Thermal conductivity (see Fourier's law)
- Ionic conductivity
- Mass transport coefficient
- Shear viscosity $\eta = \frac{1}{k_BT V} \int_0^\infty dt \, \langle \sigma_{xy}(0) \sigma_{xy} (t) \rangle$, where $\sigma$ is the viscous stress tensor (see Newtonian fluid)
- Electrical conductivity

== Transport coefficients of higher order ==
For strong gradients the transport equation typically has to be modified with higher order terms (and higher order Transport coefficients).

== See also ==
- Linear response theory
- Onsager reciprocal relations
