= Jarzynski equality =

Equation in statistical mechanics

The Jarzynski equality (JE) is an equation in statistical mechanics that relates free energy differences between two states and the irreversible work along an ensemble of trajectories joining the same states. It is named after the physicist Christopher Jarzynski (then at the University of Washington and Los Alamos National Laboratory, currently at the University of Maryland) who derived it in 1996. Fundamentally, the Jarzynski equality points to the fact that the fluctuations in the work satisfy certain constraints separately from the average value of the work that occurs in some process.

== Overview ==
In thermodynamics, the free energy difference $\Delta F = F_B - F_A$ between two states A and B is connected to the work W done on the system through the inequality:

$$\Delta F \leq W$$,

with equality holding only in the case of a quasistatic process, i.e. when one takes the system from A to B infinitely slowly (such that all intermediate states are in thermodynamic equilibrium). In contrast to the thermodynamic statement above, the JE remains valid no matter how fast the process happens. The JE states:

$$e^ { -\Delta F / k T} = \overline{ e^{ -W/kT } }.$$

Here k is the Boltzmann constant and T is the temperature of the system in the equilibrium state A or, equivalently, the temperature of the heat reservoir with which the system was thermalized before the process took place.

The over-line indicates an average over all possible realizations of an external process that takes the system from the equilibrium state A to a new, generally nonequilibrium state under the same external conditions as that of the equilibrium state B. This average over possible realizations is an average over different possible fluctuations that could occur during the process (due to Brownian motion, for example), each of which will cause a slightly different value for the work done on the system. In the limit of an infinitely slow process, the work W performed on the system in each realization is numerically the same, so the average becomes irrelevant and the Jarzynski equality reduces to the thermodynamic equality $\Delta F = W$ (see above). Away from the infinitely slow limit, the average value of the work obeys $\Delta F \leq \overline{W},$ while the distribution of the fluctuations in the work are further constrained such that $e^ { -\Delta F / k T} = \overline{ e^{ -W/kT } }.$ In this general case, W depends upon the specific initial microstate of the system, though its average can still be related to $\Delta F$ through an application of Jensen's inequality in the JE, viz.

$$\Delta F \leq \overline{W},$$

in accordance with the second law of thermodynamics.

The Jarzynski equality holds when the initial state is a Boltzmann distribution (e.g. the system is in equilibrium) and the system and environment can be described by a large number of degrees of freedom evolving under arbitrary Hamiltonian dynamics. The final state does not need to be in equilibrium. (For example, in the textbook case of a gas compressed by a piston, the gas is equilibrated at piston position A and compressed to piston position B; in the Jarzynski equality, the final state of the gas does not need to be equilibrated at this new piston position).

Since its original derivation, the Jarzynski equality has been verified in a variety of contexts, ranging from experiments with biomolecules to numerical simulations. The Crooks fluctuation theorem, proved two years later, leads immediately to the Jarzynski equality. Many other theoretical derivations have also appeared, lending further confidence to its generality.

== Examples ==
=== Fluctuation-dissipation theorem ===
Taking the log of $E[e^{-\beta W}] = e^{-\beta \Delta F}$, and use the cumulant expansion up to the second cumulant, we obtain $E[W] - \Delta F \approx \frac 12 \beta \sigma_W^2$. The left side is the work dissipated into the heat bath, and the right side could be interpreted as the fluctuation in the work due to thermal noise.

Consider dragging an overdamped particle in a viscous fluid with temperature $T$ at constant force $f$ for a time $t$. Because there is no potential energy for the particle, the change in free energy is zero, so we obtain $E[W] = \frac 12 \beta \sigma_W^2 = \frac 12 \beta f^2 \sigma_x^2$.

The work expended is $fx$, where $x$ is the total displacement during the time. The particle's displacement has a mean part due to the external dragging, and a varying part due to its own diffusion, so $\sigma_{x}^2 = 2D t$, where $D$ is the diffusion coefficient. Together, we obtain
$$f = \frac{k_B T}{D} E[x]/t$$
or $\gamma D = k_BT$, where $\gamma$ is the friction (drag) coefficient. This is the fluctuation-dissipation theorem.

In fact, for most trajectories, the work is positive, but for some rare trajectories, the work is negative, and those contribute enormously to the expectation, giving us an expectation that is exactly one.

== History ==
A question has been raised about who gave the earliest statement of the Jarzynski equality. For example, in 1977 the Russian physicists G.N. Bochkov and Yu. E. Kuzovlev (see Bibliography) proposed a generalized version of the fluctuation-dissipation theorem which holds in the presence of arbitrary external time-dependent forces. Despite its close similarity to the JE, the Bochkov-Kuzovlev result does not relate free energy differences to work measurements, as discussed by Jarzynski himself in 2007.

Another similar statement to the Jarzynski equality is the nonequilibrium partition identity, which can be traced back to Yamada and Kawasaki. (The Nonequilibrium Partition Identity is the Jarzynski equality applied to two systems whose free energy difference is zero - like straining a fluid.) However, these early statements are very limited in their application. Both Bochkov and Kuzovlev as well as Yamada and Kawasaki consider a deterministic time reversible Hamiltonian system. As Kawasaki himself noted this precludes any treatment of nonequilibrium steady states. The fact that these nonequilibrium systems heat up forever because of the lack of any thermostatting mechanism leads to divergent integrals etc. No purely Hamiltonian description is capable of treating the experiments carried out to verify the Crooks fluctuation theorem, Jarzynski equality and the fluctuation theorem. These experiments involve thermostatted systems in contact with heat baths.

== See also ==
- Fluctuation theorem - Provides an equality that quantifies fluctuations in time averaged entropy production in a wide variety of nonequilibrium systems.
- Crooks fluctuation theorem - Provides a fluctuation theorem between two equilibrium states. Implies Jarzynski equality.
- Nonequilibrium partition identity

== Bibliography ==
- Crooks, G. E. (1998), "Nonequilibrium measurements of free energy differences for microscopically reversible Markovian systems", J. Stat. Phys., 90 (5/6): 1481, Bibcode:1998JSP....90.1481C, doi:10.1023/A:1023208217925, S2CID 7014602

For earlier results dealing with the statistics of work in adiabatic (i.e. Hamiltonian) nonequilibrium processes, see:

- Bochkov, G. N.; Kuzovlev, Yu. E. (1977), "General theory of thermal fluctuations in nonlinear systems", Zh. Eksp. Teor. Fiz., 72: 238, Bibcode:1977ZhETF..72..238B; op. cit. 76, 1071 (1979)
- Bochkov, G. N.; Kuzovlev, Yu. E. (1981), "Nonlinear fluctuation-dissipation relations and stochastic models in nonequilibrium thermodynamics: I. Generalized fluctuation-dissipation theorem", Physica A, 106 (3): 443, Bibcode:1981PhyA..106..443B, doi:10.1016/0378-4371(81)90122-9; op. cit. 106A, 480 (1981)
- Kawasaki, K.; Gunton, J.D. (1973), "Theory of Nonlinear Transport Processes: Nonlinear Shear Viscosity and Normal Stress Effects", Phys. Rev. A, 8 (4): 2048, Bibcode:1973PhRvA...8.2048K, doi:10.1103/PhysRevA.8.2048
- Yamada, T.; Kawasaki, K. (1967), "Nonlinear Effects in the Shear Viscosity of Critical Mixtures", Prog. Theor. Phys., 38 (5): 1031, Bibcode:1967PThPh..38.1031Y, doi:10.1143/PTP.38.1031

For a comparison of such results, see:

- Jarzynski, C. (2007), "Comparison of far-from-equilibrium work relations", Comptes Rendus Physique, 8 (5–6): 495, arXiv:cond-mat/0612305, Bibcode:2007CRPhy...8..495J, doi:10.1016/j.crhy.2007.04.010, S2CID 119086414

For an extension to relativistic Brownian motion, see:

- Pal, P. S.; Deffner, Sebastian (2020), "Stochastic thermodynamics of relativistic Brownian motion", New Journal of Physics, 22 (7): 073054, arXiv:2003.02136, Bibcode:2020NJPh...22g3054P, doi:10.1088/1367-2630/ab9ce6
