= Debra Bernhardt =

Australian theoretical chemist

Debra Bernhardt FAA FRACI
- Born: Debra Searles; 1965 (age 60–61)
- Occupation: Theoretical chemist
- Known for: Fluctuation theorem research

Debra Bernhardt (née Searles; born 1965) is an Australian theoretical chemist. She is best known for her contributions towards understanding the fluctuation theorem. This theorem shows the second law of thermodynamics and the zeroth law of thermodynamics can be derived mathematically rather than postulated as laws of nature.

== Personal profile ==
Bernhardt has previously worked as an associate professor in the Faculty of Science at Griffith University. During her time at Griffith University, she became the founding director of the Queensland Micro- and Nanotechnology Centre. She received her PhD from the University of Newcastle for her work on quantum chemistry. In 2012, Bernhardt joined the University of Queensland as a professor in a joint appointment between the School of Chemistry and Molecular Biosciences and the Australian Institute of Bioengineering and Nanotechnology.

In 2019 Bernhardt was elected to a Fellowship of the Australian Academy of Science. She is also a Fellow of the Royal Australian Chemical Institute. In the past, Bernhardt has also held research positions at the University of Basel in Switzerland and Australian National University.

== Research interests ==
Bernhardt's research interests are in the study of liquids under equilibrium and nonequilibrium conditions, development of the theory of nonequilibrium fluids and use of simulations to assist in understanding experimental results. Current research projects include: the study of nonequilibrium liquids via statistical mechanics; nonequilibrium molecular dynamics; dynamical systems theory; chaos theory; the fluctuation theorem; the study of fluids in confined spaces; the development of algorithms for molecular dynamics simulations; and the calculation of liquid properties. Bernhardt has made significant contributions to theoretical computational chemistry, including combining quantum chemistry and molecular simulation, as well as the calculation of transport properties of materials.

== Selected publications ==
- D.J. Evans, D.J. Searles and E. Mittag (2001), "Fluctuation theorem for Hamiltonian systems - Le Chatelier's principle", Physical Review E, vol 63, 051105(4).
- H. Huber, B. Kirchner and D.J. Searles, (2002), "Is there an iceberg effect in the water/DMSO mixture?", Journal of Molecular Liquids, vol 98–99, 71–77.
- G.M. Wang, E.M. Sevick, E. Mittag, D.J. Searles and D.J. Evans, (2002) "Experimental demonstration of violations of the Second Law of Thermodynamics", Physical Review Letters, vol 89, 050601.
- D.J. Searles and H. Huber, (2002), "Accurate determination of nuclear quadrupole coupling constants and other NMR parameters in liquids from the combination of molecular dynamics simulations and ab initio calculations", Encyclopedia of Nuclear Magnetic Resonance: A Supplement, (John Wiley & Sons, Ltd, Section Ed T. Farrar), vol 9, 215–226.
- Denis J. Evans, Debra J. Searles and Stephen R. Williams, (2016) "Fundamentals of Classical Statistical Thermodynamics, Dissipation, Relaxation and Fluctuation Theorems", pp205. (Wiley VCH, Weinheim Germany) print ISBN 978-3-527-41073-6, ePub: 978-3-527-41077-5.
- Amir H. Farokh Niaei, Niaei, Tanveer Hussain, Marles Hankel and Debra J. Searles (Bernhardt) (2017), "Sodium-intercalated bulk graphdiyne as an anode material for rechargeable batteries", Journal of Power Sources, vol 343, 354–363.
- Kuk Nam Han, Stefano Bernardi, Lianzhou Wang and Debra J. Searles (Bernhardt) (2017), "Water structure and transport in zeolites with pores in one or three dimensions from molecular dynamics simulations", The Journal of Physical Chemistry C, vol 121, 381–391.
