= Robert Grayson Littlejohn =

American physicist

Robert Grayson Littlejohn is an American physicist, professor emeritus at the University of California, Berkeley.

Littlejohn completed a bachelor's degree and doctorate in physics at Berkeley, in 1975 and 1980, respectively. He then served as a post-doctoral researcher at the La Jolla Institute and the University of California, Los Angeles before returning to teach at Berkeley in 1983. He retired in 2018.

His research interests lie in the field of atomic, molecular, nuclear, optical, and plasma physics, and nonlinear dynamics, especially in the mathematical aspects of basic problems in applied physics. In recent years this has included the application of geometrical methods to few-body physics.

In 1987, he was elected a fellow of the American Physical Society, "for the introduction and development of noncanonical Hamiltonian and Lagrangian methods for the study of charged particle motion and nonlinear plasma dynamics."

== Works ==
- Lecture notes on "The Mathematical Formalism of Quantum mechanics", including bra–ket notation University of California, Berkeley.
