= Time reversal =

Time reversal may refer to:

- Reverse motion – a visual effect in which reversing the order of the frames of a film or video makes time appear to run backward
- Reverse tape effects – an audio effect in which reversing the direction of an audio recording renders sounds backward
- Time-reversal symmetry (or time reversal symmetry) – the expected symmetry of physical laws independent of whether time runs forward or backward
- Time reversibility – the ability of some processes to operate in either direction of time
- Time reversal signal processing – a technique for focusing acoustic and electromagnetic waves by reversing in time a system's response signals
- Time travel – theorised and speculative concepts about traveling into the past or the future
