= Crooks fluctuation theorem =

Statistical mechanics theorem relating non-equilibrium work to free energy differences

The Crooks fluctuation theorem (CFT), sometimes known as the Crooks equation, is an equation in statistical mechanics that relates the work done on a system during a non-equilibrium transformation to the free energy difference between the final and the initial state of the transformation. During the non-equilibrium transformation the system is at constant volume and in contact with a heat reservoir. The CFT is named after the chemist Gavin E. Crooks (then at University of California, Berkeley) who discovered it in 1998.

The most general statement of the CFT relates the probability of a space-time trajectory $x(t)$ to the time-reversal of the trajectory $\tilde{x}(t)$. The theorem says if the dynamics of the system satisfies microscopic reversibility, then the probability distribution of entropy production in the forward time trajectory is exponentially greater than entropy production in the reverse trajectory, given that it increases,

$$\frac{P[\sigma(x(t))]}{P[\sigma(\tilde{x}(t))]} = e^{\sigma[x(t)]}.$$

The above quotient is well defined because we are comparing probability densities, not point probabilities of specific trajectories. Now, if one defines a generic reaction coordinate of the system as a function of the Cartesian coordinates of the constituent particles ( e.g. , a distance between two particles), one can characterize every point along the reaction coordinate path by a parameter $\lambda$, such that $\lambda = 0$ and $\lambda = 1$ correspond to two ensembles of microstates for which the reaction coordinate is constrained to different values. A dynamical process where $\lambda$ is externally driven from zero to one, according to an arbitrary time scheduling, will be referred as forward transformation , while the time reversal path will be indicated as backward transformation. Given these definitions, the CFT sets a relation between the following five quantities:

- $P(A \rightarrow B)$, i.e. the joint probability of taking a microstate $A$ from the canonical ensemble corresponding to $\lambda = 0$ and of performing the forward transformation to the microstate $B$ corresponding to $\lambda = 1$;
- $P(A \leftarrow B)$, i.e. the joint probability of taking the microstate $B$ from the canonical ensemble corresponding to $\lambda = 1$ and of performing the backward transformation to the microstate $A$ corresponding to $\lambda = 0$;
- $\beta = (k_B T)^{-1}$, where $k_B$ is the Boltzmann constant and $T$ the temperature of the reservoir;
- $W_{A \rightarrow B}$, i.e. the work done on the system during the forward transformation (from $A$ to $B$);
- $\Delta F = F(B) - F(A)$, i.e. the Helmholtz free energy difference between the state $A$ and $B$, represented by the canonical distribution of microstates having $\lambda = 0$ and $\lambda = 1$, respectively.

The CFT equation reads as follows:

$$\frac{P(A \rightarrow B)}{P( A \leftarrow B)} = \exp [ \beta ( W_{A \rightarrow B} - \Delta F)].$$

In the previous equation the difference $W_{A \rightarrow B} - \Delta F$ corresponds to the work dissipated in the forward transformation, $W_d$. The probabilities $P(A \rightarrow B)$ and $P(A \leftarrow B)$ become identical when the transformation is performed at infinitely slow speed, i.e. for equilibrium transformations. In such cases, $W_{A \rightarrow B} = \Delta F$ and $W_d = 0.$

Using the time reversal relation $W_{A \rightarrow B} = -W_{A \leftarrow B}$, and grouping together all the trajectories yielding the same work (in the forward and backward transformation), i.e. determining the probability distribution (or density) $P_{A\rightarrow B}(W)$ of an amount of work $W$ being exerted by a random system trajectory from $A$ to $B$, we can write the above equation in terms of the work distribution functions as follows

$$P_{A \rightarrow B} (W) = P_{A\leftarrow B}(- W) ~ \exp[\beta (W - \Delta F)].$$

Note that for the backward transformation, the work distribution function must be evaluated by taking the work with the opposite sign. The two work distributions for the forward and backward processes cross at $W=\Delta F$. This phenomenon has been experimentally verified using optical tweezers for the process of unfolding and refolding of a small RNA hairpin and an RNA three-helix junction.

The CFT implies the Jarzynski equality.
