= Time-reversal symmetry =

Time reversal symmetry in physics

T-symmetry or time reversal symmetry is the theoretical symmetry of physical laws under the transformation of time reversal,
$$T: t \mapsto -t.$$

Since the second law of thermodynamics states that entropy increases as time flows toward the future, in general, the macroscopic universe does not show symmetry under time reversal. In other words, time is said to be non-symmetric, or asymmetric, except for special equilibrium states when the second law of thermodynamics predicts the time symmetry to hold. However, quantum noninvasive measurements are predicted to violate time symmetry even in equilibrium, contrary to their classical counterparts, although this has not yet been experimentally confirmed.

Time asymmetries are said to give rise to an "arrow of time" distinguishing the past of any given moment from its future. They generally fall into one of three categories:

1. those that are intrinsic to the dynamical physical laws (e.g. CP violation in the weak nuclear force),
2. those that are due to the initial conditions of the universe (e.g., for the second law of thermodynamics; see entropy as an arrow of time),
3. those that are due to (quantum) measurements (e.g., for the noninvasive measurements).

== Macroscopic phenomena ==
=== The second law of thermodynamics ===
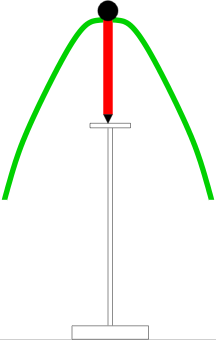
A toy called the teeter-totter illustrates, in cross-section, the two aspects of time reversal invariance. When set into motion atop a pedestal (rocking side to side, as in the image), the figure oscillates for a very long time. The toy is engineered to minimize friction and illustrate the reversibility of Newton's laws of motion. However, the mechanically stable state of the toy is when the figure falls down from the pedestal into one of arbitrarily many positions. This is an illustration of the law of increase of entropy through Boltzmann's identification of the logarithm of the number of states with the entropy.

Daily experience shows that T-symmetry does not hold for the behavior of bulk materials. Of these macroscopic laws, most notable is the second law of thermodynamics. Many other phenomena, such as the relative motion of bodies with friction, or viscous motion of fluids, reduce to this, because the underlying mechanism is the dissipation of usable energy (for example, kinetic energy) into heat.

The question of whether this time-asymmetric dissipation is really inevitable has been considered by many physicists, often in the context of Maxwell's demon. The name comes from a thought experiment described by James Clerk Maxwell in which a microscopic demon guards a gate between two halves of a room. It only lets slow molecules into one half, only fast ones into the other. By eventually making one side of the room cooler than before and the other hotter, it seems to reduce the entropy of the room, and reverse the arrow of time. Many analyses have been made of this; all show that when the entropy of room and demon are taken together, this total entropy does increase. Modern analyses of this problem have taken into account Claude E. Shannon's relation between entropy and information. Many interesting results in modern computing are closely related to this problem—reversible computing, quantum computing and physical limits to computing, are examples. These seemingly metaphysical questions are today, in these ways, slowly being converted into hypotheses of the physical sciences.

The current consensus hinges upon the Boltzmann–Shannon identification of the logarithm of phase space volume with the negative of Shannon information, and hence to entropy. In this notion, a fixed initial state of a macroscopic system corresponds to relatively low entropy because the coordinates of the molecules of the body are constrained. As the system evolves in the presence of dissipation, the molecular coordinates can move into larger volumes of phase space, becoming more uncertain, and thus leading to increase in entropy.

=== Big Bang ===
One resolution to irreversibility is to say that the constant increase of entropy we observe happens only because of the initial state of our universe. Other possible states of the universe (for example, a universe at heat death equilibrium) would actually result in no increase of entropy. In this view, the apparent T-asymmetry of our universe is a problem in cosmology: why did the universe start with a low entropy? This view, supported by cosmological observations (such as the isotropy of the cosmic microwave background) connects this problem to the question of initial conditions of the universe.

=== Black holes ===
The laws of gravity seem to be time reversal invariant in classical mechanics; however, specific solutions need not be.

An object can cross through the event horizon of a black hole from the outside, and then fall rapidly to the central region where our understanding of physics breaks down. Since within a black hole the forward light-cone is directed towards the center and the backward light-cone is directed outward, it is not even possible to define time-reversal in the usual manner. The only way anything can escape from a black hole is as Hawking radiation.

The time reversal of a black hole would be a hypothetical object known as a white hole. From the outside they appear similar. While a black hole has a beginning and is inescapable, a white hole has an ending and cannot be entered. The forward light-cones of a white hole are directed outward; and its backward light-cones are directed towards the center.

The event horizon of a black hole may be thought of as a surface moving outward at the local speed of light and is just on the edge between escaping and falling back. The event horizon of a white hole is a surface moving inward at the local speed of light and is just on the edge between being swept outward and succeeding in reaching the center. They are two different kinds of horizons—the horizon of a white hole is like the horizon of a black hole turned inside-out.

The modern view of black hole irreversibility is to relate it to the second law of thermodynamics, since black holes are viewed as thermodynamic objects. For example, according to the gauge–gravity duality conjecture, all microscopic processes in a black hole are reversible, and only the collective behavior is irreversible, as in any other macroscopic, thermal system.

=== Kinetic consequences: detailed balance and Onsager reciprocal relations ===
In physical and chemical kinetics, T-symmetry of the mechanical microscopic equations implies two important laws: the principle of detailed balance and the Onsager reciprocal relations. T-symmetry of the microscopic description together with its kinetic consequences are called microscopic reversibility.

=== Effect of time reversal on some variables of classical physics ===
==== Even ====
Classical variables that do not change upon time reversal include:

- $\vec x$, position of a particle in three-space
- $\vec a$, acceleration of the particle
- $\vec F$, force on the particle
- $E$, energy of the particle
- $V$, electric potential (voltage)
- $\vec E$, electric field
- $\vec D$, electric displacement
- $\rho$, density of electric charge
- $\vec P$, electric polarization
- Energy density of the electromagnetic field
- $T_{ij}$, Maxwell stress tensor
- All masses, charges, coupling constants, and other physical constants, except those associated with the weak force.

==== Odd ====
Classical variables that time reversal negates include:

- $t$, the time when an event occurs
- $\vec v$, velocity of a particle
- $\vec p$, linear momentum of a particle
- $\vec L$, angular momentum of a particle (both orbital and spin)
- $\vec A$, electromagnetic vector potential
- $\vec B$, magnetic field
- $\vec H$, magnetic auxiliary field
- $\vec j$, density of electric current
- $\vec M$, magnetization
- $\vec S$, Poynting vector
- $\mathcal{P}$, power (rate of work done).

==== Example: Magnetic Field and Onsager reciprocal relations ====
Let us consider the example of a system of charged particles subject to a constant external magnetic field: in this case the canonical time reversal operation that reverses the velocities and the time $t$ and keeps the coordinates untouched is no more a symmetry for the system. Under this consideration, it seems that only Onsager–Casimir reciprocal relations could hold; these equalities relate two different systems, one subject to $\vec B$ and another to $-\vec B$, and so their utility is limited. However, it was proved that it is possible to find other time reversal operations which preserve the dynamics and so Onsager reciprocal relations; in conclusion, one cannot state that the presence of a magnetic field always breaks T-symmetry.

== Microscopic phenomena: time reversal invariance ==
Most systems are asymmetric under time reversal, but there may be phenomena with symmetry. In classical mechanics, a velocity v reverses under the operation of T, but an acceleration does not. Therefore, one models dissipative phenomena through terms that are odd in v. However, delicate experiments in which known sources of dissipation are removed reveal that the laws of mechanics are time reversal invariant. Dissipation itself is originated in the second law of thermodynamics.

The motion of a charged body in a magnetic field, B involves the velocity through the Lorentz force term v×B, and might seem at first to be asymmetric under T. A closer look assures us that B also changes sign under time reversal. This happens because a magnetic field is produced by an electric current, J, which reverses sign under T. Thus, the motion of classical charged particles in electromagnetic fields is also time reversal invariant. (Despite this, it is still useful to consider the time-reversal non-invariance in a local sense when the external field is held fixed, as when the magneto-optic effect is analyzed. This allows one to analyze the conditions under which optical phenomena that locally break time-reversal, such as Faraday isolators and directional dichroism, can occur.)

Physics separates the laws of motion, called kinematics, from the laws of force, called dynamics. Following the classical kinematics of Newton's laws of motion, the kinematics of quantum mechanics is built in such a way that it presupposes nothing about the time reversal symmetry of the dynamics. In other words, if the dynamics are invariant, then the kinematics will allow it to remain invariant; if the dynamics is not, then the kinematics will also show this. The structure of the quantum laws of motion are richer, and we examine these next.

=== Time reversal in quantum mechanics ===
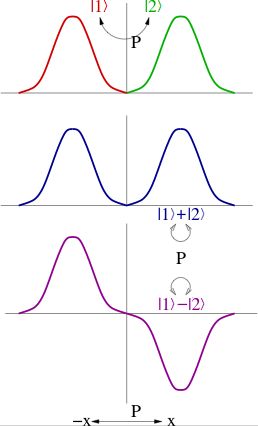
Two-dimensional representations of parity are given by a pair of quantum states that go into each other under parity. However, this representation can always be reduced to linear combinations of states, each of which is either even or odd under parity. One says that all irreducible representations of parity are one-dimensional. Kramers' theorem states that time reversal need not have this property because it is represented by an anti-unitary operator.

This section contains a discussion of the three most important properties of time reversal in quantum mechanics; chiefly,

1. that it must be represented as an anti-unitary operator,
2. that it protects non-degenerate quantum states from having an electric dipole moment,
3. that it has two-dimensional representations with the property T^{2} = −1 (for fermions).

The strangeness of this result is clear if one compares it with parity. If parity transforms a pair of quantum states into each other, then the sum and difference of these two basis states are states of good parity. Time reversal does not behave like this. It seems to violate the theorem that all abelian groups be represented by one-dimensional irreducible representations. The reason it does this is that it is represented by an anti-unitary operator. It thus opens the way to spinors in quantum mechanics.

On the other hand, the notion of quantum-mechanical time reversal turns out to be a useful tool for the development of physically motivated quantum computing and simulation settings, providing, at the same time, relatively simple tools to assess their complexity. For instance, quantum-mechanical time reversal was used to develop novel boson sampling schemes and to prove the duality between two fundamental optical operations, beam splitter and squeezing transformations.

=== Formal notation ===
In formal mathematical presentations of T-symmetry, three different kinds of notation for T need to be carefully distinguished: the T that is an involution, capturing the actual reversal of the time coordinate, the T that is an ordinary finite dimensional matrix, acting on spinors and vectors, and the T that is an operator on an infinite-dimensional Hilbert space.

For a real (not complex) classical (unquantized) scalar field $\phi$, the time reversal involution can simply be written as

$$\mathsf{T} \phi(t,\vec{x}) = \phi^\prime(-t,\vec{x}) = s\phi(t,\vec{x})$$

as time reversal leaves the scalar value at a fixed spacetime point unchanged, up to an overall sign $s=\pm 1$. A slightly more formal way to write this is

$$\mathsf{T}: \phi(t,\vec{x}) \mapsto \phi^\prime(-t,\vec{x})  = s\phi(t,\vec{x})$$

which has the advantage of emphasizing that $\mathsf{T}$ is a map, and thus the "mapsto" notation $\mapsto ~,$ whereas $\phi^\prime(-t,\vec{x}) = s\phi(t,\vec{x})$ is a factual statement relating the old and new fields to one-another.

Unlike scalar fields, spinor and vector fields $\psi$ might have a non-trivial behavior under time reversal. In this case, one has to write

$$\mathsf{T}: \psi(t,\vec{x}) \mapsto \psi^\prime(-t,\vec{x}) = T\psi(t,\vec{x})$$

where $T$ is just an ordinary matrix. For complex fields, complex conjugation may be required, for which the mapping $K: (x+iy) \mapsto (x-iy)$ can be thought of as a 2×2 matrix. For a Dirac spinor, $T$ cannot be written as a 4×4 matrix, because, in fact, complex conjugation is indeed required; however, it can be written as an 8×8 matrix, acting on the 8 real components of a Dirac spinor.

In the general setting, there is no ab initio value to be given for $T$; its actual form depends on the specific equation or equations which are being examined. In general, one simply states that the equations must be time-reversal invariant, and then solves for the explicit value of $T$ that achieves this goal. In some cases, generic arguments can be made. Thus, for example, for spinors in three-dimensional Euclidean space, or four-dimensional Minkowski space, an explicit transformation can be given. It is conventionally given as

$$T=e^{i\pi J_y}K$$

where $J_y$ is the y-component of the angular momentum operator and $K$ is complex conjugation, as before. This form follows whenever the spinor can be described with a linear differential equation that is first-order in the time derivative, which is generally the case in order for something to be validly called "a spinor".

The formal notation now makes it clear how to extend time-reversal to an arbitrary tensor field $\psi_{abc\cdots}$ In this case,

$$\mathsf{T}: \psi_{abc\cdots}(t,\vec{x}) \mapsto \psi_{abc\cdots}^\prime(-t,\vec{x})  = {T_a}^d \,{T_b}^e \,{T_c}^f \cdots \psi_{def\cdots}(t,\vec{x})$$

Covariant tensor indexes will transform as ${T_a}^b = {(T^{-1})_b}^a$ and so on. For quantum fields, there is also a third T, written as $\mathcal{T},$ which is actually an infinite dimensional operator acting on a Hilbert space. It acts on quantized fields $\Psi$ as

$$\mathsf{T}: \Psi(t,\vec{x}) \mapsto \Psi^\prime(-t,\vec{x})  = \mathcal{T} \Psi(t,\vec{x}) \mathcal{T}^{-1}$$

This can be thought of as a special case of a tensor with one covariant, and one contravariant index, and thus two $\mathcal{T}$'s are required.

All three of these symbols capture the idea of time-reversal; they differ with respect to the specific space that is being acted on: functions, vectors/spinors, or infinite-dimensional operators. The remainder of this article is not cautious to distinguish these three; the T that appears below is meant to be either $\mathsf{T}$ or $T$ or $\mathcal{T},$ depending on context, left for the reader to infer.

=== Anti-unitary representation of time reversal ===
Eugene Wigner showed that a symmetry operation S of a Hamiltonian is represented, in quantum mechanics either by a unitary operator, S = U, or an antiunitary one, S = UK where U is unitary, and K denotes a basis-dependent complex conjugation operator. These are the only operations that act on Hilbert space so as to preserve the length of the projection of any one state-vector onto another state-vector.

For a particle with spin J, one can use the representation

$$T = \eta e^{-i\pi J_y/\hbar} K,$$

where J_{y} is the y-component of the spin, and use of TJT^{−1} = −J has been made, and $\eta$ is an arbitrary phase.

=== Electric dipole moments ===
This has an interesting consequence on the electric dipole moment (EDM) of any particle. The EDM is defined through the shift in the energy of a state when it is put in an external electric field: Δe = d·E + E·δ·E, where d is called the EDM and δ, the induced dipole moment. One important property of an EDM is that the energy shift due to it changes sign under a parity transformation. However, since d is a vector, its expectation value in a state |ψ⟩ must be proportional to ⟨ψ| J |ψ⟩, that is the expected spin. Thus, under time reversal, an invariant state must have vanishing EDM. In other words, a non-vanishing EDM signals both P and T symmetry-breaking.

Some molecules, such as water, must have EDM irrespective of whether T is a symmetry. This is correct; if a quantum system has degenerate ground states that transform into each other under parity, then time reversal need not be broken to give EDM.

Experimentally observed bounds on the electric dipole moment of the nucleon currently set stringent limits on the violation of time reversal symmetry in the strong interactions, and their modern theory: quantum chromodynamics. Then, using the CPT invariance of a relativistic quantum field theory, this puts strong bounds on strong CP violation.

Experimental bounds on the electron electric dipole moment also place limits on theories of particle physics and their parameters.

=== Kramers' theorem ===
For T, which is an anti-unitary Z_{2} symmetry generator

T^{2} = UKUK = UU^{*} = U (U^{T})^{−1} = Φ,

where Φ is a diagonal matrix of phases. As a result, U = ΦU^{T} and U^{T} = UΦ, showing that

U = Φ U Φ.

This means that the entries in Φ are ±1, as a result of which one may have either T^{2} = ±1. This is specific to the anti-unitarity of T. For a unitary operator, such as the parity, any phase is allowed.

Next, take a Hamiltonian invariant under T. Let |a⟩ and T|a⟩ be two quantum states of the same energy. Now, if T^{2} = −1, then one finds that the states are orthogonal: a result called Kramers' theorem. This implies that if T^{2} = −1, then there is a twofold degeneracy in the state. This result in non-relativistic quantum mechanics presages the spin statistics theorem of quantum field theory.

Quantum states that give unitary representations of time reversal, i.e., have T^{2} = 1, are characterized by a multiplicative quantum number, sometimes called the T-parity.

=== Time reversal of the known dynamical laws ===
Particle physics codified the basic laws of dynamics into the Standard Model. This is formulated as a quantum field theory that has CPT symmetry, i.e., the laws are invariant under simultaneous operation of time reversal, parity and charge conjugation. However, time reversal itself is seen not to be a symmetry (this is usually called CP violation). There are two possible origins of this asymmetry, one through the mixing of different flavours of quarks in their weak decays, the second through a direct CP violation in strong interactions. The first is seen in experiments; the second is strongly constrained by the non-observation of the EDM of a neutron.

Time reversal violation is unrelated to the second law of thermodynamics, because due to the conservation of the CPT symmetry, the effect of time reversal is to rename particles as antiparticles and vice versa. Thus the second law of thermodynamics is thought to originate in the initial conditions in the universe.

=== Time reversal of noninvasive measurements ===
Strong measurements (both classical and quantum) are certainly disturbing, causing asymmetry due to the second law of thermodynamics. However, noninvasive measurements should not disturb the evolution, so they are expected to be time-symmetric. Surprisingly, it is true only in classical physics but not in quantum physics, even in a thermodynamically invariant equilibrium state. This type of asymmetry is independent of CPT symmetry but has not yet been confirmed experimentally due to extreme conditions of the checking proposal.

=== Negative group delay in quantum systems ===
In 2024, experiments by the University of Toronto showed that under certain quantum conditions, photons can exhibit "negative time" behavior. When interacting with atomic clouds, photons appeared to exit the medium before entering it, indicating a negative group delay, especially near atomic resonance. Using the cross-Kerr effect, the team measured atomic excitation by observing phase shifts in a weak probe beam. The results showed that atomic excitation times varied from negative to positive, depending on the pulse width. For narrow pulses, the excitation time was approximately −0.82 times the non-post-selected excitation time (τ_{0}), while for broader pulses, it was around 0.54 times τ_{0}. These findings align with theoretical predictions and highlight the non-classical nature of quantum mechanics, opening new possibilities for quantum computing and photonics.

== See also ==
- Arrow of time
- Causality (physics)
- Computing applications
  - Limits of computation
  - Quantum computing
  - Reversible computing
- Standard Model
  - CKM matrix
  - CP violation
  - CP violating moments
  - CPT invariance
  - Neutrino mass
  - Strong CP problem
  - Wheeler–Feynman absorber theory
- Loschmidt's paradox
- Maxwell's demon
- Microscopic reversibility
- Second law of thermodynamics
- Time translation symmetry
- Time reversal (disambiguation)
