= Internal pressure =

Property of a thermodynamic system

Internal pressure is a measure of how the internal energy of a system changes when it expands or contracts at constant temperature. It has the same dimensions as pressure, the SI unit of which is the pascal.

Internal pressure is usually given the symbol $\pi_T$. It is defined as a partial derivative of internal energy with respect to volume at constant temperature:

$$\pi _T  = \left ( \frac{\partial U}{\partial V} \right )_T$$

== Thermodynamic equation of state ==
Internal pressure can be expressed in terms of temperature, pressure and their mutual dependence:

$$\pi_T = T \left ( \frac{\partial p}{\partial T} \right )_V - p$$

This equation is one of the simplest thermodynamic equations. More precisely, it is a thermodynamic property relation, since it holds true for any system and connects the equation of state to one or more thermodynamic energy properties. Here we refer to it as a "thermodynamic equation of state."

=== Derivation of the thermodynamic equation of state ===
The fundamental thermodynamic equation states for the exact differential of the internal energy:

$$\operatorname{d}U = T \operatorname{d} S - p \operatorname{d} V$$

Dividing this equation by $\operatorname{d} V$ at constant temperature gives:

$$\left ( \frac{\partial U}{\partial V} \right )_T = T \left ( \frac{\partial S}{\partial V} \right )_T -p$$

And using one of the Maxwell relations:

$\left ( \frac{\partial S}{\partial V} \right )_T = \left ( \frac{\partial p}{\partial T} \right )_V\$, this gives
$$\pi_T =  T \left ( \frac{\partial p}{\partial T} \right )_V -p$$

== Perfect gas ==
In a perfect gas, there are no potential energy interactions between the particles, so any change in the internal energy of the gas is directly proportional to the change in the kinetic energy of its constituent species and therefore also to the change in temperature:

$$\operatorname{d} U \propto \operatorname{d}T$$.

The internal pressure is taken to be at constant temperature, therefore

$dT = 0$, which implies $dU = 0$ and finally $\pi _T = 0$,

i.e. the internal energy of a perfect gas is independent of the volume it occupies. The above relation can be used as a definition of a perfect gas.

The relation $\pi _T = 0$ can be proved without the need to invoke any molecular arguments. It follows directly from the thermodynamic equation of state if we use the ideal gas law $pV = nRT$. We have

$$\pi_T = T \left ( \frac{\partial p}{\partial T} \right )_V - p = T (\frac{nR}{V}) - (\frac{nRT}{V}) = 0$$

== Real gases ==
Plot of internal energy vs. volume for gases with different internal pressures

Real gases have non-zero internal pressures because their internal energy changes as the gases expand isothermally - it can increase on expansion ($\pi _T > 0$, signifying presence of dominant attractive forces between the particles of the gas) or decrease ($\pi _T < 0$, dominant repulsion).

In the limit of infinite volume these internal pressures reach the value of zero:

$$\lim_{V \to \infty} \pi_T = 0$$,

corresponding to the fact that all real gases can be approximated to be perfect in the limit of a suitably large volume. The above considerations are summarized on the graph on the right.

If a real gas can be described by the van der Waals equation

$$p = \frac{nRT}{V-nb} - a \frac{n^2}{V^2}$$

it follows from the thermodynamic equation of state that

$$\pi_T = a \frac{n^2}{V^2}$$

Since the parameter $a$ is always positive, so is its internal pressure: internal energy of a van der Waals gas always increases when it expands isothermally.

The $a$ parameter models the effect of attractive forces between molecules in the gas. However, real non-ideal gases may be expected to exhibit a sign change between positive and negative internal pressures under the right environmental conditions if repulsive interactions become important, depending on the system of interest. Loosely speaking, this would tend to happen under conditions of temperature and pressure such that $Z$ the compression factor of the gas, is greater than 1.

In addition, through the use of the Euler chain relation it can be shown that

$$\left ( \frac{\partial U}{\partial V} \right )_T = - \left ( \frac{\partial U}{\partial T} \right )_V \left ( \frac{\partial T}{\partial V} \right )_U$$

Defining $\mu_J = \left ( \frac{\partial T}{\partial V} \right )_U$ as the "Joule coefficient" and recognizing $\left ( \frac{\partial U}{\partial T} \right )_V$ as the heat capacity at constant volume $= C_V$, we have

$$\pi_T = - C_V  \mu_J$$

The coefficient $\mu_J$ can be obtained by measuring the temperature change for a constant-$U$ experiment, i.e., an adiabatic free expansion (see below). This coefficient is often small, and usually negative at modest pressures (as predicted by the van der Waals equation).

== Experiment ==
James Joule tried to measure the internal pressure of air in his expansion experiment by adiabatically pumping high pressure air from one metal vessel into another evacuated one. The water bath in which the system was immersed did not change its temperature, signifying that no change in the internal energy occurred. Thus, the internal pressure of the air was apparently equal to zero and the air acted as a perfect gas. The actual deviations from the perfect behaviour were not observed since they are very small and the specific heat capacity of water is relatively high.

Much later, in 1925 Frederick Keyes and Francis Sears published measurements of the Joule effect for carbon dioxide at $T_1$= 30 °C, $P_1$= (13.3-16.5) atm using improved measurement techniques and better controls. Under these conditions the temperature dropped when the pressure was adiabatically lowered, which indicates that $\mu_J$ is negative. This is consistent with the van der Waals gas prediction that $\pi_T$ is positive.

== Bibliography ==
- Peter Atkins and Julio de Paula, Physical Chemistry 8th edition, pp. 60–61 (2006).
