= Maximum term method =

The maximum-term method is a consequence of the large numbers encountered in statistical mechanics. It states that under appropriate conditions the logarithm of a summation is essentially equal to the logarithm of the maximum term in the summation.

These conditions are (see also proof below) that (1) the number of terms in the sum is large and (2) the terms themselves scale exponentially with this number. A typical application is the calculation of a thermodynamic potential from a partition function. These functions often contain terms with factorials $n!$ which scale as $n^{1/2}n^n/e^n$ (Stirling's approximation).

== Example ==
$$\lim_{M\rightarrow\infty} \cfrac{\ln\left({\sum_{N=1}^M N!}\right)}{\ln{M!}} = 1 \$$

== Proof ==
Consider the sum

$$S = \sum_{N=1}^M T_N \$$

where $T_N$>0 for all N. Since all the terms are positive, the value of S must be greater than the value of the largest term, $T_{\max}$, and less than the product of the number of terms and the value of the largest term. So we have

$$T_{\max} \le S \le M T_{\max}. \$$

Taking logarithm gives

$$\ln T_{\max} \le \ln S \le \ln T_{\max}+\ln M. \$$

As frequently happens in statistical mechanics, we assume that $T_{\max}$ will be $O(\ln M!) = O(e^M)$: see Big O notation.

Here we have

$$O(M) \le \ln S \le O(M)+ \ln M \qquad \Rightarrow
1 \le \frac{\ln S}{O(M)} \le 1 + \frac{\ln M}{O(M)} = 1 + o(1)$$

For large M, $\ln M$ is negligible with respect to M itself, and so $\ln M/O(e^M) \in o(1)$. Then, we can see that ln S is bounded from above and below by $\ln T_{\max}$, and so

$$\frac{\ln S}{O(\ln T_{\max})} = 1\$$
