= Fiber derivative =

In the context of Lagrangian mechanics, the fiber derivative is used to convert between the Lagrangian and Hamiltonian forms. In particular, if $Q$ is the configuration manifold then the Lagrangian $L$ is defined on the tangent bundle $TQ$ , and the Hamiltonian is defined on the cotangent bundle $T^* Q$—the fiber derivative is a map $\mathbb{F}L:TQ \rightarrow T^* Q$ such that

$$\mathbb{F}L(v) \cdot w = \left. \frac{d}{ds} \right|_{s=0} L(v+sw)$$,

where $v$ and $w$ are vectors from the same tangent space. When restricted to a particular point, the fiber derivative is a Legendre transformation.
