= Thermodynamic square =

Scientific mnemonic diagram

The thermodynamic square with potentials highlighted in red. Key: G = Gibbs free energy p = Pressure H = Enthalpy S = Entropy U = Internal energy V = Volume F = Helmholtz free energy T = Temperature

The thermodynamic square (also known as the thermodynamic wheel, Guggenheim scheme (after Edward A. Guggenheim) or Born square) is a mnemonic diagram attributed to Max Born and used to help determine thermodynamic relations. Born presented the thermodynamic square in a 1929 lecture. The symmetry of thermodynamics appears in a paper by F.O. Koenig. The corners represent common conjugate variables while the sides represent thermodynamic potentials. The placement and relation among the variables serves as a key to recall the relations they constitute.

A mnemonic used by students to remember the Maxwell relations (in thermodynamics) is "Good Physicists Have Studied Under Very Fine Teachers", which helps them remember the order of the variables in the square, in clockwise direction. Another mnemonic used here is "Valid Facts and Theoretical Understanding Generate Solutions to Hard Problems", which gives the letter in the normal left-to-right writing direction. Both times A has to be identified with F, another common symbol for Helmholtz free energy. To prevent the need for this switch the following mnemonic is also widely used:"Good Physicists Have Studied Under Very Ambitious Teachers"; another one is Good Physicists Have SUVAT, in reference to the equations of motion. One other useful variation of the mnemonic when the symbol E is used for internal energy instead of U is the following: "Some Hard Problems Go To Finish Very Easy".

== Use ==
=== Derivatives of thermodynamic potentials ===
The thermodynamic square is mostly used to compute the derivative of any thermodynamic potential of interest. Suppose for example one desires to compute the derivative of the internal energy $U$. The following procedure should be considered:

1. Place oneself in the thermodynamic potential of interest, namely ($G$, $H$, $U$, $F$). In our example, that would be $U$.
2. The two opposite corners of the potential of interest represent the coefficients of the overall result. If the coefficient lies on the left hand side of the square, a negative sign should be added. In our example, an intermediate result would be $dU = - p\,[\text{Differential}] + T\,[\text{Differential}]$.
3. In the opposite corner of each coefficient, you will find the associated differential. In our example, the opposite corner to $p$ would be $V$ (volume) and the opposite corner for $T$ would be $S$ (entropy). In our example, an interim result would be: $dU=-p\,dV+T\,dS$. Notice that the sign convention will affect only the coefficients, not the differentials.
4. Finally, always add $\mu\,dN$, where $\mu$ denotes the chemical potential. Therefore, we would have: $dU=-p\,dV+T\,dS+\mu\,dN$.

The other three equations that can be derived using this technique are as follows:

1. $\mathrm{d}F = -p \mathrm{d}V - S \mathrm{d} T + \mu \mathrm{d}N$
2. $\mathrm{d} G = +V \mathrm{d}p - S \mathrm{d}T + \mu \mathrm{d}N$
3. $\mathrm{d}H = + V \mathrm{d}p + T \mathrm{d}S + \mu \mathrm{d}N$

The Gibbs–Duhem equation can be derived by using this technique. Notice though that the final addition of the differential of the chemical potential has to be generalized.

=== Maxwell relations ===
The thermodynamic square can also be used to find the first-order derivatives in the common Maxwell relations. The following procedure should be considered:

1. Looking at the four corners of the square and make a $\sqcup$ shape with the quantities of interest.
2. Read the $\sqcup$ shape in two different ways by seeing it as L and ⅃. The L will give one side of the relation and the ⅃ will give the other. Note that the partial derivative is taken along the vertical stem of L (and ⅃) while the last corner is held constant.
3. Use L to find $LHS = \left ({\partial S\over\partial p} \right)_T$.
4. Similarly, use ⅃ to find $RHS=-\left ({\partial V\over\partial T} \right)_p$. Again, notice that the sign convention affects only the variable held constant in the partial derivative, not the differentials.
5. Finally, use above equations to get the Maxwell relation: $\left ({\partial S\over\partial p} \right)_T = -\left ({\partial V\over\partial T} \right)_p$.

By rotating the $\sqcup$ shape (randomly, for example by 90 degrees counterclockwise into a $\sqsupset$ shape) other relations such as: $\left ({\partial p\over\partial T} \right)_V = \left ({\partial S\over\partial V} \right)_T$ can be found.

=== Natural variables of thermodynamic potentials ===
Finally, the potential at the center of each side is a natural function of the variables at the corner of that side. So, $G$ is a natural function of $p$ and $T$, and $U$ is a natural function of $S$ and $V$.
