= Maxwell relations =

Partial differential relations in thermodynamics

The Maxwell relations in thermodynamics can be derived from the symmetry of second derivatives and the definitions of the thermodynamic potentials, or from Jacobian determinants. The most common Maxwell relations involve the potential functions $U$ (the total internal energy), $H$ (enthalpy), $A$ (Helmholtz free energy), and $G$ (Gibbs free energy), and the functions of state $P$ (pressure), $T$ (absolute temperature), $V$ (volume), and $S$ (entropy).

They are named for the physicist James Clerk Maxwell, who first presented them in his text Theory of Heat (1872). Maxwell's relations are useful in problem-solving quantities that are difficult to measure to those that are easier to work with. Numerous mnemonic devices exist for remembering them, notably, the thermodynamic square.

== Equations ==
The structure of Maxwell relations is a statement of equality among the second derivatives for continuous functions. It follows directly from the fact that the order of differentiation of an analytic function of two variables is irrelevant (Schwarz theorem). In the case of Maxwell relations the function considered is a thermodynamic potential and $x_i$ and $x_j$ are two different natural variables for that potential,

Schwarz's theorem (general)

$\frac{\partial }{\partial x_j}\left(\frac{\partial \Phi}{\partial x_i}\right)= \frac{\partial }{\partial x_i}\left(\frac{\partial \Phi}{\partial x_j}\right)$

where the partial derivatives are taken with all other natural variables held constant. For every thermodynamic potential there are $\frac{1}{2} n(n-1)$ possible Maxwell relations where $n$ is the number of natural variables for that potential.

== The four most common Maxwell relations ==
Flow chart showing the paths between the Maxwell relations. $P$ is pressure, $T$ temperature, $V$ volume, $S$ entropy, $\alpha$ coefficient of thermal expansion, $\kappa$ compressibility, $C_V$ heat capacity at constant volume, $C_P$ heat capacity at constant pressure.

The four most common Maxwell relations are the equalities of the second derivatives of each of the four thermodynamic potentials, with respect to their thermal natural variable (temperature $T$, or entropy $S$) and their mechanical natural variable (pressure $P$, or volume $V$):

Maxwell's relations (common)

$$\begin{align}
+\left(\frac{\partial T}{\partial V}\right)_S &=& -\left(\frac{\partial P}{\partial S}\right)_V &=& \frac{\partial^2 U }{\partial S \partial V}\\
+\left(\frac{\partial T}{\partial P}\right)_S &=& +\left(\frac{\partial V}{\partial S}\right)_P &=& \frac{\partial^2 H }{\partial S \partial P}\\
+\left(\frac{\partial S}{\partial V}\right)_T &=& +\left(\frac{\partial P}{\partial T}\right)_V &=& -\frac{\partial^2 F }{\partial T \partial V}\\
-\left(\frac{\partial S}{\partial P}\right)_T &=& +\left(\frac{\partial V}{\partial T}\right)_P &=& \frac{\partial^2 G }{\partial T \partial P}
\end{align}\,\!$$

where the potentials as functions of their natural thermal and mechanical variables are the internal energy $U(S, V)$, enthalpy $H(S, P)$, Helmholtz free energy $F(T, V)$, and Gibbs free energy $G(T, P)$. The thermodynamic square can be used as a mnemonic to recall and derive these relations. The usefulness of these relations lies in their quantifying entropy changes, which are not directly measurable, in terms of measurable quantities like temperature, volume, and pressure.

Each equation can be re-expressed using the reciprocal relation
$$\left(\frac{\partial y}{\partial x}\right)_z
=
1\biggl/\left(\frac{\partial x}{\partial y}\right)_z.$$

== Derivations ==
=== First derivation ===
For a given set of four real variables $(x, y, z, w)$, restricted to move on a 2-dimensional $C^2$ surface in $\R^4$. Knowing two of them enables the remaining two to be determined. In particular, one may take any two variables as the independent variables, and let the other two be the dependent variables, then take all these partial derivatives.

This derivation exploits the reciprocal relation

$\left(\frac{\partial w}{\partial y}\right)_{z} = \left(\frac{\partial w}{\partial x}\right)_{z} \left(\frac{\partial x}{\partial y}\right)_{z},$

and the cyclical relation

$\left(\frac{\partial x}{\partial y}\right)_z \left(\frac{\partial y}{\partial z}\right)_x \left(\frac{\partial z}{\partial x}\right)_y = -1.$

There are four real variables $(T, S, P, V)$, restricted on the 2-dimensional surface of possible thermodynamic states. This allows us to use the previous two propositions.

It suffices to prove the first of the four relations, as the other three can be obtained by transforming the first relation using the previous two propositions. Pick $V, S$ as the independent variables, and $U$ as the dependent variable. Start with the thermodynamic identity $dU = -PdV + TdS$.

Now, $\partial_{V,S}U = \partial_{S, V}U$ since the surface is $C^2$, that is,
$$\left[\frac{\partial}{\partial V} \left(\frac{\partial U}{\partial S}\right)_{V} \right]_{S} = \left[\frac{\partial}{\partial S} \left(\frac{\partial U}{\partial V}\right)_{S} \right]_{V},$$
which yields the result.

=== Derivation in terms of Jacobians ===
This derivation is as follows. Since $dU = TdS - PdV$, for any cycle,
$$0 = \oint dU = \oint TdS - \oint PdV.$$
Taking the cycle infinitesimal yields $\frac{\partial(P, V)}{\partial(T, S)} = 1$. That is, the map preserves area. Maxwell's relations therefore state in a cyclic process, that the work done by the system (given by the area of the closed cycle in the $PV$-plane) must be equal to the heat absorbed (the area of the closed cycle in the $TS$-plane). By the chain rule for Jacobians, for any coordinate transformation $(x, y)$,
$$\frac{\partial(P, V)}{\partial(x, y)} = \frac{\partial(T, S)}{\partial(x, y)}.$$
Now setting $(x, y)$ to various values gives us the four Maxwell relations. For example, setting $(x, y) = (P, S)$ gives $\left(\frac{\partial T}{\partial P}\right)_S = \left(\frac{\partial V}{\partial S}\right)_P.$

=== Extended derivations ===
Maxwell relations are based on simple partial differentiation rules, in particular the total differential of a function and the symmetry of evaluating second order partial derivatives.

Derivation

Derivation of the Maxwell relation can be deduced from the differential forms of the thermodynamic potentials:
The differential form of internal energy U is
$$dU = T \, dS - P \, dV$$
This equation resembles total differentials of the form
$$dz = \left(\frac{\partial z}{\partial x}\right)_y\!dx + \left(\frac{\partial z}{\partial y}\right)_x\! dy$$
It can be shown, for any equation of the form,
$$dz = M \, dx + N \, dy$$
that
$$M = \left(\frac{\partial z}{\partial x}\right)_y, \quad
N = \left(\frac{\partial z}{\partial y}\right)_x$$
Consider, the equation $dU = T \, dS - P \, dV$. We can now immediately see that
$$T = \left(\frac{\partial U}{\partial S}\right)_V, \quad
-P = \left(\frac{\partial U}{\partial V}\right)_S$$
Since we also know that for functions with continuous second derivatives, the mixed partial derivatives are identical (Symmetry of second derivatives), that is, that
$$\frac{\partial}{\partial y}\left(\frac{\partial z}{\partial x}\right)_y =
\frac{\partial}{\partial x}\left(\frac{\partial z}{\partial y}\right)_x =
\frac{\partial^2 z}{\partial y \partial x} = \frac{\partial^2 z}{\partial x \partial y}$$
we therefore can see that
$$\frac{\partial}{\partial V}\left(\frac{\partial U}{\partial S}\right)_V =
\frac{\partial}{\partial S}\left(\frac{\partial U}{\partial V}\right)_S$$
and therefore that
$$\left(\frac{\partial T}{\partial V}\right)_S = -\left(\frac{\partial P}{\partial S}\right)_V$$

Derivation of Maxwell Relation from Helmholtz Free energy

The differential form of Helmholtz free energy is
$$dF = -S \, dT - P \, dV$$
$$-S = \left(\frac{\partial F}{\partial T}\right)_V, \quad
-P = \left(\frac{\partial F}{\partial V}\right)_T$$
From symmetry of second derivatives
$$\frac{\partial}{\partial V}\left(\frac{\partial F}{\partial T}\right)_V =
\frac{\partial}{\partial T}\left(\frac{\partial F}{\partial V}\right)_T$$
and therefore that
$$\left(\frac{\partial S}{\partial V}\right)_T = \left(\frac{\partial P}{\partial T}\right)_V$$
The other two Maxwell relations can be derived from differential form of enthalpy $dH = T \, dS + V \, dP$ and the differential form of Gibbs free energy $dG = V \, dP - S \, dT$ in a similar way. So all Maxwell Relationships above follow from one of the Gibbs equations.

Extended derivation

Combined form first and second law of thermodynamics,

$$T \, dS = dU + P \, dV$$	Eq.1

U, S, and V are state functions. Let,

- $U = U(x,y)$
- $S = S(x,y)$
- $V = V(x,y)$
- $dU = \left(\frac{\partial U}{\partial x}\right)_y\!dx + \left(\frac{\partial U}{\partial y}\right)_x\!dy$
- $dS = \left(\frac{\partial S}{\partial x}\right)_y\!dx + \left(\frac{\partial S}{\partial y}\right)_x\!dy$
- $dV = \left(\frac{\partial V}{\partial x}\right)_y\!dx + \left(\frac{\partial V}{\partial y}\right)_x\!dy$

Substitute them in Eq.1 and one gets,
$$T\left(\frac{\partial S}{\partial x}\right)_y\!dx +
T\left(\frac{\partial S}{\partial y}\right)_x\!dy = \left(\frac{\partial U}{\partial x}\right)_y\!dx +
\left(\frac{\partial U}{\partial y}\right)_x\!dy + P\left(\frac{\partial V}{\partial x}\right)_y\!dx +
P\left(\frac{\partial V}{\partial y}\right)_x\!dy$$
And also written as,
$$\left(\frac{\partial U}{\partial x}\right)_y\!dx +
\left(\frac{\partial U}{\partial y}\right)_x\!dy = T\left(\frac{\partial S}{\partial x}\right)_y\!dx +
T\left(\frac{\partial S}{\partial y}\right)_x\!dy - P\left(\frac{\partial V}{\partial x}\right)_y\!dx -
P\left(\frac{\partial V}{\partial y}\right)_x\!dy$$
comparing the coefficient of dx and dy, one gets
$$\left(\frac{\partial U}{\partial x}\right)_y = T\left(\frac{\partial S}{\partial x}\right)_y - P\left(\frac{\partial V}{\partial x}\right)_y$$
$$\left(\frac{\partial U}{\partial y}\right)_x = T\left(\frac{\partial S}{\partial y}\right)_x - P\left(\frac{\partial V}{\partial y}\right)_x$$
Differentiating above equations by y, x respectively

$$\left(\frac{\partial^2U}{\partial y\partial x}\right) = \left(\frac{\partial T}{\partial y}\right)_x \left(\frac{\partial S}{\partial x}\right)_y + T\left(\frac{\partial^2 S}{\partial y\partial x}\right) - \left(\frac{\partial P}{\partial y}\right)_x \left(\frac{\partial V}{\partial x}\right)_y - P\left(\frac{\partial^2 V}{\partial y\partial x}\right)$$	Eq.2

and

$$\left(\frac{\partial^2U}{\partial x\partial y}\right) = \left(\frac{\partial T}{\partial x}\right)_y \left(\frac{\partial S}{\partial y}\right)_x + T\left(\frac{\partial^2 S}{\partial x\partial y}\right) - \left(\frac{\partial P}{\partial x}\right)_y \left(\frac{\partial V}{\partial y}\right)_x - P\left(\frac{\partial^2 V}{\partial x\partial y}\right)$$	Eq.3

U, S, and V are exact differentials, therefore,
$$\left(\frac{\partial^2U}{\partial y\partial x}\right) = \left(\frac{\partial^2U}{\partial x\partial y}\right)$$
$$\left(\frac{\partial^2S}{\partial y\partial x}\right) = \left(\frac{\partial^2S}{\partial x\partial y}\right)$$
$$\left(\frac{\partial^2V}{\partial y\partial x}\right) = \left(\frac{\partial^2V}{\partial x\partial y}\right)$$
Subtract Eq.2 and Eq.3 and one gets
$$\left(\frac{\partial T}{\partial y}\right)_x \left(\frac{\partial S}{\partial x}\right)_y - \left(\frac{\partial P}{\partial y}\right)_x \left(\frac{\partial V}{\partial x}\right)_y = \left(\frac{\partial T}{\partial x}\right)_y \left(\frac{\partial S}{\partial y}\right)_x - \left(\frac{\partial P}{\partial x}\right)_y \left(\frac{\partial V}{\partial y}\right)_x$$
Note: The above is called the general expression for Maxwell's thermodynamical relation.

Maxwell's first relation
Allow x = S and y = V and one gets
$$\left(\frac{\partial T}{\partial V}\right)_S = -\left(\frac{\partial P}{\partial S}\right)_V$$
Maxwell's second relation
Allow x = S and y = P and one gets
$$\left(\frac{\partial T}{\partial P}\right)_S = \left(\frac{\partial V}{\partial S}\right)_P$$
Maxwell's third relation
Allow x = T and y = V and one gets
$$\left(\frac{\partial S}{\partial V}\right)_T = \left(\frac{\partial P}{\partial T}\right)_V$$
Maxwell's fourth relation
Allow x = T and y = P and one gets
$$\left(\frac{\partial S}{\partial P}\right)_T = -\left(\frac{\partial V}{\partial T}\right)_P$$

== General Maxwell relationships ==
The above are not the only Maxwell relationships. When other work terms involving other natural variables besides the volume work are considered or when the number of particles is included as a natural variable, other Maxwell relations become apparent. For example, if we have a single-component gas, then the number of particles N is also a natural variable of the above four thermodynamic potentials. The Maxwell relationship for the enthalpy with respect to pressure and particle number would then be:

$$\left(\frac{\partial \mu}{\partial P}\right)_{S, N} =
\left(\frac{\partial V}{\partial N}\right)_{S, P}\qquad=
\frac{\partial^2 H }{\partial P \partial N}$$

where μ is the chemical potential. In addition, there are other thermodynamic potentials besides the four that are commonly used, and each of these potentials will yield a set of Maxwell relations. For example, the grand potential $\Omega(\mu, V, T)$ yields:
$$\begin{align}
\left(\frac{\partial N}{\partial V}\right)_{\mu, T} &=& \left(\frac{\partial P}{\partial \mu}\right)_{V,T} &=& -\frac{\partial^2 \Omega }{\partial \mu \partial V}\\
\left(\frac{\partial N}{\partial T}\right)_{\mu, V} &=& \left(\frac{\partial S}{\partial \mu}\right)_{V,T} &=& -\frac{\partial^2 \Omega }{\partial \mu \partial T}\\
\left(\frac{\partial P}{\partial T}\right)_{\mu, V} &=& \left(\frac{\partial S}{\partial V}\right)_{\mu,T} &=& -\frac{\partial^2 \Omega }{\partial V \partial T}
\end{align}$$

== See also ==
- Table of thermodynamic equations
- Thermodynamic equations
