= Particle number =

Number of particles in a thermodynamic system

Pressure	Volume
(Stress)	(Strain)
Temperature	Entropy
Chemical potential	Particle number

In thermodynamics, the particle number (symbol N) of a thermodynamic system is the number of constituent particles in that system. The particle number is a fundamental thermodynamic property which is conjugate to the chemical potential. Unlike most physical quantities, the particle number is a dimensionless quantity, specifically a countable quantity. It is an extensive property, as it is directly proportional to the size of the system under consideration and thus meaningful only for closed systems.

A constituent particle is one that cannot be broken into smaller pieces at the scale of energy k·T involved in the process (where k is the Boltzmann constant and T is the temperature). For example, in a thermodynamic system consisting of a piston containing water vapour, the particle number is the number of water molecules in the system. The meaning of constituent particles, and thereby of particle numbers, is thus temperature-dependent.

== Determining the particle number ==
The concept of particle number plays a major role in theoretical considerations. In situations where the actual particle number of a given thermodynamical system needs to be determined, mainly in chemistry, it is not practically possible to measure it directly by counting the particles. If the material is homogeneous and has a known amount of substance n expressed in moles, the particle number N can be found by the relation : $N = nN_A$, where N_{A} is the Avogadro constant.

== Particle number density ==
A related intensive system parameter is the particle number density (or particle number concentration, PNC), a quantity of kind volumetric number density obtained by dividing the particle number of a system by its volume. This parameter is often denoted by the lower-case letter n.

== In quantum mechanics ==
In quantum mechanical processes, the total number of particles may not be preserved. The concept is therefore generalized to the particle number operator, that is, the observable that counts the number of constituent particles. In quantum field theory, the particle number operator (see Fock state) is conjugate to the phase of the classical wave (see coherent state).

== In air quality ==
One measure of air pollution used in air quality standards is the atmospheric concentration of particulate matter. This measure is usually expressed in μg/m^{3} (micrograms per cubic metre). In the current EU emission norms for cars, vans, and trucks and in the upcoming EU emission norm for non-road mobile machinery, particle number measurements and limits are defined, commonly referred to as PN, with units [#/km] or [#/kWh]. In this case, PN expresses a quantity of particles per unit distance (or work).
