= Conjugate variables (thermodynamics) =

Pair of values which express a thermodynamic system's internal energy

In thermodynamics, the internal energy of a system is expressed as a sum of products of conjugate variables such as temperature and entropy, pressure and volume, or chemical potential and particle number. In fact, all thermodynamic potentials are expressed in terms of conjugate pairs. The product of two quantities that are conjugate has units of energy or sometimes power.

The basic definition of energy, expressed as a small increment as the product of a force times a small displacement, used in dynamics of bodies is adopted in thermodynamics. An increment in the energy of a thermodynamic system can be expressed as the sum of the products of certain generalized "forces" that, when unbalanced, cause certain generalized "displacements", and the product of the two is the energy transferred as a result. These forces and their associated displacements are called conjugate variables. The thermodynamic force is always an intensive variable and the displacement is always an extensive variable, yielding an extensive energy transfer. The intensive (force) variable is the derivative of the internal energy with respect to the extensive (displacement) variable, while all other extensive variables are held constant.

The thermodynamic square can be used as a tool to recall and derive some of the thermodynamic potentials based on conjugate variables.

In the above description, the product of two conjugate variables yields an energy. In other words, the conjugate pairs are conjugate with respect to energy. In general, conjugate pairs can be defined with respect to any thermodynamic state function. Conjugate pairs with respect to entropy are often used, in which the product of the conjugate pairs yields an entropy. Such conjugate pairs are particularly useful in the analysis of irreversible processes, as exemplified in the derivation of the Onsager reciprocal relations.

== Overview ==
Similarly to the product of a force times a small displacement used in dymamics of bodies, so an increment in the energy of a thermodynamic system can be expressed as the sum of the products of certain generalized "forces" which, when unbalanced, cause certain generalized "displacements" to occur, with their product being the energy transferred as a result. These forces and their associated displacements are called conjugate variables. For example, consider the $pV$ conjugate pair. The pressure $p$ acts as a generalized force: Pressure differences force a change in volume $\mathrm dV$, and their product is the energy lost by the system due to work. Here, pressure is the driving force, volume is the associated displacement, and the two form a pair of conjugate variables. In a similar way, temperature differences drive changes in entropy, and their product is the energy transferred by heat transfer. The thermodynamic force is always an intensive variable and the displacement is always an extensive variable, yielding an extensive energy. The intensive (force) variable is the derivative of the (extensive) internal energy with respect to the extensive (displacement) variable, with all other extensive variables held constant.

The theory of thermodynamic potentials is not complete until one considers the number of particles in a system as a variable on par with the other extensive quantities such as volume and entropy. The number of particles is, like volume and entropy, the displacement variable in a conjugate pair. The generalized force component of this pair is the chemical potential. The chemical potential may be thought of as a force which, when imbalanced, pushes an exchange of particles, either with the surroundings, or between phases inside the system. In cases where there are a mixture of chemicals and phases, this is a useful concept. For example, if a container holds liquid water and water vapor, there will be a chemical potential (which is negative) for the liquid which pushes the water molecules into the vapor (evaporation) and a chemical potential for the vapor, pushing vapor molecules into the liquid (condensation). Only when these "forces" equilibrate, and the chemical potential of each phase is equal, is equilibrium obtained.

The most commonly considered conjugate thermodynamic variables are (with corresponding SI units):

Thermal parameters
- Temperature: $T$ (K)
- Entropy: $S$ (J K^{−1})
Mechanical parameters
- Pressure: $p$ (Pa= J m^{−3})
- Volume: $V$ (m^{3} = J Pa^{−1})

or, more generally,

- Stress: $\sigma_{ij}\,$ (Pa= J m^{−3})
- Volume × Strain: $V\times\varepsilon_{ij}$ (m^{3} = J Pa^{−1})
Material parameters
- chemical potential: $\mu$ (J)
- particle number: $N$ (particles or mole)

For a system with different types $i$ of particles, a small change in the internal energy is given by:
$$\mathrm{d}U = T\,\mathrm{d}S - p\,\mathrm{d}V + \sum_i \mu_i \,\mathrm{d}N_i\,,$$
where $U$ is internal energy, $T$ is temperature, $S$ is entropy, $p$ is pressure, $V$ is volume, $\mu_i$ is the chemical potential of the $i$-th particle type, and $N_i$ is the number of $i$-type particles in the system.

Here, the temperature, pressure, and chemical potential are the generalized forces, which drive the generalized changes in entropy, volume, and particle number respectively. These parameters all affect the internal energy of a thermodynamic system. A small change $\mathrm{d}U$ in the internal energy of the system is given by the sum of the flow of energy across the boundaries of the system due to the corresponding conjugate pair. These concepts will be expanded upon in the following sections.

While dealing with processes in which systems exchange matter or energy, classical thermodynamics is not concerned with the rate at which such processes take place, termed kinetics. For this reason, the term thermodynamics is usually used synonymously with equilibrium thermodynamics. A central notion for this connection is that of quasistatic processes, namely idealized, "infinitely slow" processes. Time-dependent thermodynamic processes far away from equilibrium are studied by non-equilibrium thermodynamics. This can be done through linear or non-linear analysis of irreversible processes, allowing systems near and far away from equilibrium to be studied, respectively.

== Pressure/volume and stress/strain pairs ==
As an example, consider the $pV$ conjugate pair. The pressure acts as a generalized force – pressure differences force a change in volume, and their product is the energy lost by the system due to mechanical work. Pressure is the driving force, volume is the associated displacement, and the two form a pair of conjugate variables.

The above holds true only for non-viscous fluids. In the case of viscous fluids and plastic and elastic solids, the pressure force is generalized to the stress tensor, and changes in volume are generalized to the volume multiplied by the strain tensor. These then form a conjugate pair. If $\sigma_{ij}$ is the $ij$ component of the stress tensor, and $\varepsilon_{ij}$ is the $ij$ component of the strain tensor, then the mechanical work done as the result of a stress-induced infinitesimal strain $\mathrm \varepsilon_{ij}$ is:
$$\delta w = V\sum_{ij}\sigma_{ij}\,\mathrm d\varepsilon_{ij}$$
or, using Einstein notation for the tensors, in which repeated indices are assumed to be summed:
$$\delta w = V\sigma_{ij}\,\mathrm d\varepsilon_{ij}$$

In the case of pure compression (i.e. no shearing forces), the stress tensor is simply the negative of the pressure times the unit tensor so that
$$\delta w = V\,(-p\delta_{ij})\,\mathrm d \varepsilon_{ij}= - \sum_k pV \,\mathrm d \varepsilon_{kk}.$$

The trace of the strain tensor ($\varepsilon_{kk}$) is the fractional change in volume so that the above reduces to $\delta w = -p \,\mathrm dV$ as it should.

== Temperature/entropy pair ==
In a similar way, temperature differences drive changes in entropy, and their product is the energy transferred by heating. Temperature is the driving force, entropy is the associated displacement, and the two form a pair of conjugate variables. The temperature/entropy pair of conjugate variables is the only term named heat; the other terms are various forms of thermodynamic work, including electric work in the expression of Gibbs free energy.

== Chemical potential/particle number pair ==
The chemical potential is like a force which pushes an increase in particle number. In cases where there are mixtures of chemicals in different phases, this is a useful concept. For example, if a container holds water and water vapor, there will be a chemical potential for the liquid, pushing water molecules into the vapor (evaporation) and a chemical potential for the vapor, pushing vapor molecules into the liquid (condensation). Only when these "forces" equilibrate is equilibrium obtained.

== See also ==
- Generalized coordinate and generalized force: analogous conjugate variable pairs found in classical mechanics.
- Intensive and extensive properties
- Bond graph
