= Intensive and extensive properties =

Properties independent of system size, and proportional to system size

Physical or chemical properties of materials and systems can often be categorized as being either intensive or extensive, according to how the property changes when the size (or extent) of the system changes. The terms "intensive and extensive quantities" were introduced into physics by German mathematician Georg Helm in 1898, and by American physicist and chemist Richard C. Tolman in 1917.

According to the International Union of Pure and Applied Chemistry (IUPAC), an intensive property or intensive quantity is one whose magnitude (extent) is independent of the size of the system. An intensive property is not necessarily homogeneously distributed in space; it can vary from place to place in a body of matter and radiation. Examples of intensive properties include temperature, T; refractive index, n; density, ρ; and hardness, η.

By contrast, an extensive property or extensive quantity is one whose magnitude is additive for subsystems. Examples include mass, volume and Gibbs energy.

Not all properties of matter fall into these two categories. For example, the square root of the volume is neither intensive nor extensive. If a system is doubled in size by juxtaposing a second identical system, the value of an intensive property equals the value for each subsystem and the value of an extensive property is twice the value for each subsystem. However, the property $\sqrt V$ is instead multiplied by $\sqrt 2$.

The distinction between intensive and extensive properties has some theoretical uses. For example, in thermodynamics, the state of a simple compressible system is completely specified by two independent, intensive properties, along with one extensive property, such as mass. Other intensive properties are derived from those two intensive variables.

== Intensive properties ==
An intensive property is a physical quantity whose value does not depend on the amount of substance which was measured. The simplest intensive quantities are ratios of extensive quantities. In a homogeneous system divided into two halves, all its extensive properties, in particular its volume and its mass, are divided into two halves. All its intensive properties, such as the mass per volume (mass density) or volume per mass (specific volume), must remain the same in each half.

The temperature of a system in thermal equilibrium is the same as the temperature of any part of it, so temperature is an intensive quantity. If the system is divided by a wall that is permeable to heat or to matter, the temperature of each subsystem is identical. Additionally, the boiling temperature of a substance is an intensive property. For example, the boiling temperature of water is 100 °C at a pressure of one atmosphere, regardless of the quantity of water remaining as liquid.

=== Examples ===
Examples of intensive properties include:

- charge density, ρ (or ne)
- chemical potential, μ
- color
- concentration, c
- electrical conductivity (or specific conductance), σ (sometimes κ or γ)
- electric permittivity, ε
- electrical resistivity, ρ
- energy density, ρ
- magnetic permeability, μ
- mass density, ρ (or specific gravity)
- melting point and boiling point
- molality, m or b
- molar mass, M
- molar volume, V_{m}
- pressure, p
- refractive index
- specific heat capacity, c_{p}
- specific internal energy, u
- specific rotation, [α]
- specific volume, v
- standard reduction potential, E°
- surface tension
- temperature, T
- thermal conductivity
- velocity v
- viscosity

See List of materials properties for a more exhaustive list specifically pertaining to materials.

== Extensive properties ==
An extensive property is a physical quantity whose value is proportional to the size of the system it describes, or to the quantity of matter in the system. For example, the mass of a sample is an extensive quantity; it depends on the amount of substance. The related intensive quantity is the density, which is independent of the amount. The density of water is approximately 1g/mL for both a drop of water and a swimming pool, but the mass is different in the two cases.

Dividing one extensive property by another extensive property gives an intensive property—for example: mass (extensive) divided by volume (extensive) gives density (intensive).

Any extensive quantity E for a sample can be divided by the sample's volume to become the "E density" for the sample; similarly, any extensive quantity "E" can be divided by the sample's mass, to become the sample's "specific E"; extensive quantities "E" which have been divided by the number of moles in their sample are referred to as "molar E".

=== Examples ===
Examples of extensive properties include:

- amount of substance, n
- enthalpy, H
- entropy, S
- Gibbs energy, G
- heat capacity, C_{p}
- Helmholtz energy, A or F
- internal energy, U
- spring stiffness, K
- mass, m
- volume, V

== Conjugate quantities ==
In thermodynamics, some extensive quantities measure amounts that are conserved in a thermodynamic process of transfer. They are transferred across a wall between two thermodynamic systems or subsystems. For example, species of matter may be transferred through a semipermeable membrane. Likewise, volume may be thought of as transferred in a process in which there is a motion of the wall between two systems, increasing the volume of one and decreasing that of the other by equal amounts.

On the other hand, some extensive quantities measure amounts that are not conserved in a thermodynamic process of transfer between a system and its surroundings. In a thermodynamic process in which a quantity of energy is transferred from the surroundings into or out of a system as heat, a corresponding quantity of entropy in the system respectively increases or decreases, but, in general, not in the same amount as in the surroundings. Likewise, a change in the amount of electric polarization in a system is not necessarily matched by a corresponding change in electric polarization in the surroundings.

In a thermodynamic system, transfers of extensive quantities are associated with changes in respective specific intensive quantities. For example, a volume transfer is associated with a change in pressure. An entropy change is associated with a temperature change. A change in the amount of electric polarization is associated with an electric field change. The transferred extensive quantities and their associated respective intensive quantities have dimensions that multiply to give the dimensions of energy. The two members of such respective specific pairs are mutually conjugate. Either one, but not both, of a conjugate pair may be set up as an independent state variable of a thermodynamic system. Conjugate setups are associated by Legendre transformations.

== Composite properties ==
The ratio of two extensive properties of the same object or system is an intensive property. For example, the ratio of an object's mass and volume, which are two extensive properties, is density, which is an intensive property.

More generally, properties can be combined to give new properties, which may be called derived or composite properties. For example, the base quantities mass and volume can be combined to give the derived quantity density. These composite properties can sometimes also be classified as intensive or extensive. Suppose a composite property $F$ is a function of a set of intensive properties $\{a_i\}$ and a set of extensive properties $\{A_j\}$, which can be shown as $F(\{a_i\},\{A_j\})$. If the size of the system is changed by some scaling factor, $\lambda$, only the extensive properties will change, since intensive properties are independent of the size of the system. The scaled system, then, can be represented as $F(\{a_i\},\{\lambda A_j\})$.

Intensive properties are independent of the size of the system, so the property F is an intensive property if for all values of the scaling factor, $\lambda$,
$$F(\{a_i\},\{\lambda A_j\}) = F(\{a_i\},\{A_j\}).$$
(This is equivalent to saying that intensive composite properties are homogeneous functions of degree 0 with respect to $\{A_j\}$.)

It follows, for example, that the ratio of two extensive properties is an intensive property. To illustrate, consider a system having a certain mass, $m$, and volume, $V$. The density, $\rho$ is equal to mass (extensive) divided by volume (extensive): $\textstyle \rho = \frac{m}{V}$. If the system is scaled by the factor $\lambda$, then the mass and volume become $\lambda m$ and $\lambda V$, and the density becomes $\textstyle \rho = \frac{\lambda m}{\lambda V}$; the two $\lambda$s cancel, so this could be written mathematically as $\rho (\lambda m, \lambda V) = \rho (m, V)$, which is analogous to the equation for $F$ above.

The property $F$ is an extensive property if for all $\lambda$,
$$F(\{a_i\},\{\lambda A_j\}) = \lambda F(\{a_i\},\{A_j\}).$$
(This is equivalent to saying that extensive composite properties are homogeneous functions of degree 1 with respect to $\{A_j\}$.) It follows from Euler's homogeneous function theorem that
$$F(\{a_i\},\{A_j\}) = \sum_j A_j \left(\frac{\partial F}{\partial A_j}\right),$$
where the partial derivative is taken with all parameters constant except $A_j$. This last equation can be used to derive thermodynamic relations.

=== Specific properties ===
A specific property is the intensive property obtained by dividing an extensive property of a system by its mass. For example, heat capacity is an extensive property of a system. Dividing heat capacity, $C_p$, by the mass of the system gives the specific heat capacity, $c_p$, which is an intensive property. When the extensive property is represented by an upper-case letter, the symbol for the corresponding intensive property is usually represented by a lower-case letter. Common examples are given in the table below.

Specific properties derived from extensive properties
| Extensive | | | Intensive (specific) | | | Intensive (molar) | | |
| Property | Symbol | SI units | Property | Symbol | SI units | Property | Symbol | SI units |
|---|---|---|---|---|---|---|---|---|
| Volume | V | m^{3} or L | Specific volume (a.k.a. the reciprocal of density) | v | m^{3}/kg or L/Kg | Molar volume | V_{m} | m^{3}/mol or L/mol |
| Internal energy | U | J | Specific internal energy | u | J/kg | Molar internal energy | U_{m} | J/mol |
| Enthalpy | H | J | Specific enthalpy | h | J/kg | Molar enthalpy | H_{m} | J/mol |
| Gibbs free energy | G | J | Specific Gibbs free energy | g | J/kg | Chemical potential | G_{m} or μ | J/mol |
| Entropy | S | J/K | Specific entropy | s | J/(kg·K) | Molar entropy | S_{m} | J/(mol·K) |
| Heat capacity at constant volume | C_{V} | J/K | Specific heat capacity at constant volume | c_{V} | J/(kg·K) | Molar heat capacity at constant volume | C_{V,m} | J/(mol·K) |
| Heat capacity at constant pressure | C_{P} | J/K | Specific heat capacity at constant pressure | c_{P} | J/(kg·K) | Molar heat capacity at constant pressure | C_{P,m} | J/(mol·K) |

=== Molar properties ===
If the amount of substance in moles can be determined, then each of these thermodynamic properties may be expressed on a molar basis, and their name may be qualified with the adjective molar, yielding terms such as molar volume, molar internal energy, molar enthalpy, and molar entropy. The symbol for molar quantities may be indicated by adding a subscript "m" to the corresponding extensive property. For example, molar enthalpy is $H_{\mathrm m}$. Molar Gibbs free energy is commonly referred to as chemical potential, symbolized by $\mu$, particularly when discussing a partial molar Gibbs free energy $\mu_i$ for a component $i$ in a mixture.

For the characterization of substances or reactions, tables usually report the molar properties referred to a standard state. In that case a superscript $^{\circ}$ is added to the symbol. Examples:

- $V_{\mathrm m}^{\circ}$ = 22.4 L/mol is the molar volume of an ideal gas at standard conditions of 1 atm (101.325 kPa) and 0 °C (273.15 K).
- $C_{P,\mathrm m}^{\circ}$ is the standard molar heat capacity of a substance at constant pressure.
- $\mathrm \Delta_{\mathrm r} H_{\mathrm m}^{\circ}$ is the standard enthalpy variation of a reaction (with subcases: formation enthalpy, combustion enthalpy ...).
- $E^{\circ}$ is the standard reduction potential of a redox couple, i.e. Gibbs energy over charge, which is measured in volts, V (joules per coulomb, J/C).

=== Limitations ===
The intensive/extensive classification is most useful in macroscopic equilibrium thermodynamics, where “scaling up” is understood as combining independent copies of a system so that extensive quantities are additive for subsystems, while intensive quantities are independent of the extent (size) of the system.

This classification is not exhaustive. Well-defined derived quantities can be formed (for example, $\sqrt{V}$) that are neither additive (extensive) nor size-independent (intensive). Such quantities are typically not used as independent thermodynamic state variables, but they show that “intensive vs extensive” is a convenient classification rather than a universal taxonomy.

The classification can also become context-dependent when the way components are combined introduces additional coupling or constraints. Redlich emphasized that care is needed to distinguish generalized coordinates (often extensive, such as total charge) from their conjugate generalized forces (often intensive, such as voltage), and noted that in electrical assemblies the variables that remain equal across components versus those that add can depend on how components are connected (for example, series versus parallel connections).

Finally, some quantities commonly treated as intensive material properties are meaningful only in a macroscopic (continuum) description. For example, transport coefficients such as viscosity may not be well defined for extremely small systems, and some physical properties can become size-dependent at very small scales (for example, the optical response of quantum dots depends on particle size).
