= Heat capacity ratio =

Thermodynamic quantity

Heat capacity ratio for various gases
| Gas | Temp. [°C] | γ |
|---|---|---|
| H_{2} | −181 | 1.597 |
| H_{2} | −76 | 1.453 |
| H_{2} | 20 | 1.410 |
| H_{2} | 100 | 1.404 |
| H_{2} | 400 | 1.387 |
| H_{2} | 1000 | 1.358 |
| H_{2} | 2000 | 1.318 |
| He | 20 | 1.66 |
| Ar | −180 | 1.760 |
| Ar | 20 | 1.670 |
| O_{2} | −181 | 1.450 |
| O_{2} | −76 | 1.415 |
| O_{2} | 20 | 1.400 |
| O_{2} | 100 | 1.399 |
| O_{2} | 200 | 1.397 |
| O_{2} | 400 | 1.394 |
| N_{2} | −181 | 1.470 |
| Cl_{2} | 20 | 1.340 |
| Ne | 19 | 1.640 |
| Xe | 19 | 1.660 |
| Kr | 19 | 1.680 |
| Hg | 360 | 1.670 |
| H_{2}O | 20 | 1.330 |
| H_{2}O | 100 | 1.324 |
| H_{2}O | 200 | 1.310 |
| CO_{2} | 0 | 1.310 |
| CO_{2} | 20 | 1.300 |
| CO_{2} | 100 | 1.281 |
| CO_{2} | 400 | 1.235 |
| CO_{2} | 1000 | 1.195 |
| CO | 20 | 1.400 |
| NO | 20 | 1.400 |
| N_{2}O | 20 | 1.310 |
| CH_{4} | −115 | 1.410 |
| CH_{4} | −74 | 1.350 |
| CH_{4} | 20 | 1.320 |
| NH_{3} | 15 | 1.310 |
| SO_{2} | 15 | 1.290 |
| C_{2}H_{6} | 15 | 1.220 |
| C_{3}H_{8} | 16 | 1.130 |
| Dry air | -15 | 1.404 |
| Dry air | 0 | 1.403 |
| Dry air | 20 | 1.400 |
| Dry air | 200 | 1.398 |
| Dry air | 400 | 1.393 |
| Dry air | 1000 | 1.365 |

In thermal physics and thermodynamics, the heat capacity ratio, also known as the adiabatic index, the ratio of specific heats, or Laplace's coefficient, is the ratio of the heat capacity at constant pressure (C_{P}) to heat capacity at constant volume (C_{V}). It is sometimes also known as the isentropic expansion factor and is denoted by γ (gamma) for an ideal gas (Note: γ first appeared in an article by the French mathematician, engineer, and physicist Siméon Denis Poisson: Poisson (1808). "Mémoire sur la théorie du son" [Memoir on the theory of sound]. Journal de l'École Polytechnique (in French). 7 (14): 319–392. On p. 332, Poisson defines γ merely as a small deviation from equilibrium which causes small variations of the equilibrium value of the density ρ.; In Poisson's article of 1823 –: Poisson (1823). "Sur la vitesse du son" [On the speed of sound]. Annales de chimie et de physique. 2nd series (in French). 23: 5–16.; γ was expressed as a function of density D (p. 8) or of pressure P (p. 9). Meanwhile, in 1816 the French mathematician and physicist Pierre-Simon Laplace had found that the speed of sound depends on the ratio of the specific heats.: Laplace (1816). "Sur la vitesse du son dans l'air et dans l'eau" [On the speed of sound in air and in water]. Annales de chimie et de physique. 2nd series (in French). 3: 238–241.; However, he didn't denote the ratio as γ. In 1825, Laplace stated that the speed of sound is proportional to the square root of the ratio of the specific heats: Laplace, P.S. (1825). Traité de mecanique celeste [Treatise on celestial mechanics] (in French). Vol. 5. Paris, France: Bachelier. pp. 127–137. On p. 127, Laplace defines the symbols for the specific heats, and on p. 137 (at the bottom of the page), Laplace presents the equation for the speed of sound in a perfect gas.; In 1851, the Scottish mechanical engineer William Rankine showed that the speed of sound is proportional to the square root of Poisson's γ: Rankine, William John Macquorn (1851). "On Laplace's Theory of Sound". Philosophical Magazine. 4th series. 1 (3): 225–227.; It follows that Poisson's γ is the ratio of the specific heats — although Rankine didn't state that explicitly.: See also: Krehl, Peter O. K. (2009). History of Shock Waves, Explosions and Impact: A Chronological and Biographical Reference. Berlin and Heidelberg, Germany: Springer Verlag. p. 276. ISBN 9783540304210.) or κ (kappa), the isentropic exponent for a real gas. The symbol γ is used by aerospace and chemical engineers.
$$\gamma = \frac{C_P}{C_V} = \frac{\bar{C}_P}{\bar{C}_V} = \frac{c_P}{c_V},$$
where C is the heat capacity, ${\bar{C}}$ the molar heat capacity (heat capacity per mole), and c the specific heat capacity (heat capacity per unit mass) of a gas. The suffixes P and V refer to constant-pressure and constant-volume conditions respectively.

The heat capacity ratio is important for its applications in thermodynamical reversible processes, especially involving ideal gases; the speed of sound depends on this factor.

== Thought experiment ==
To understand this relation, consider the following thought experiment. A closed pneumatic cylinder contains air. The piston is locked. The pressure inside is equal to atmospheric pressure. This cylinder is heated to a certain target temperature. Since the piston cannot move, the volume is constant. The temperature and pressure will rise. When the target temperature is reached, the heating is stopped. The amount of energy added equals C_{V} ΔT, with ΔT representing the change in temperature.

The piston is now freed and moves outwards, stopping as the pressure inside the chamber reaches atmospheric pressure. We assume the expansion occurs without exchange of heat (adiabatic expansion). Doing this work, air inside the cylinder will cool to below the target temperature.

To return to the target temperature (still with a free piston), the air must be heated, but is no longer under constant volume, since the piston is free to move as the gas is reheated. This extra heat amounts to about 40% more than the previous amount added. In this example, the amount of heat added with a locked piston is proportional to C_{V}, whereas the total amount of heat added is proportional to C_{P}. Therefore, the heat capacity ratio in this example is 1.4.

Another way of understanding the difference between C_{P} and C_{V} is that C_{P} applies if work is done to the system, which causes a change in volume (such as by moving a piston so as to compress the contents of a cylinder), or if work is done by the system, which changes its temperature (such as heating the gas in a cylinder to cause a piston to move). C_{V} applies only if $P\,\mathrm{d}V = 0$, that is, no work is done. Consider the difference between adding heat to the gas with a locked piston and adding heat with a piston free to move, so that pressure remains constant.

In the second case, the gas will both heat and expand, causing the piston to do mechanical work on the atmosphere. The heat that is added to the gas goes only partly into heating the gas, while the rest is transformed into the mechanical work performed by the piston.

In the first, constant-volume case (locked piston), there is no external motion, and thus no mechanical work is done on the atmosphere; C_{V} is used. In the second case, additional work is done as the volume changes, so the amount of heat required to raise the gas temperature (the specific heat capacity) is higher for this constant-pressure case.

== Ideal-gas relations ==
For an ideal gas, the molar heat capacity is at most a function of temperature, since the internal energy is solely a function of temperature for a closed system, i.e., $U = U(n,T)$, where n is the amount of substance in moles. In thermodynamic terms, this is a consequence of the fact that the internal pressure of an ideal gas vanishes.

Mayer's relation allows us to deduce the value of C_{V} (molar heat capacity at constant volume) from the more easily measured (and more commonly tabulated) value of C_{P} (molar heat capacity at constant pressure):
$$C_V = C_P - R.$$

This relation may be used to show the heat capacities may be expressed in terms of the heat capacity ratio (γ) and the gas constant (R):
$$\begin{align}
&C_P = \frac{\gamma R}{\gamma - 1}, &&C_V = \frac{R}{\gamma - 1}\\
&\gamma = \frac{C_P}{C_P-R}, &&\gamma = 1 + \frac{R}{C_V}
\end{align}$$

=== Relation with degrees of freedom ===
The classical equipartition theorem predicts that the heat capacity ratio (γ) for an ideal gas can be related to the thermally accessible degrees of freedom (f) of a molecule by
$$\gamma = 1 + \frac{2}{f},\quad \text{or} \quad f = \frac{2}{\gamma - 1}.$$

Thus we observe that for a monatomic gas, with 3 translational degrees of freedom per atom:
$$\gamma = \frac{5}{3} = 1.6666\ldots,$$

As an example of this behavior, at 273 K (0 °C) the noble gases He, Ne, and Ar all have nearly the same value of γ, equal to 1.664.

For a diatomic gas, often 5 degrees of freedom are assumed to contribute at room temperature since each molecule has 3 translational and 2 rotational degrees of freedom, and the single vibrational degree of freedom is often not included since vibrations are often not thermally active except at high temperatures, as predicted by quantum statistical mechanics. Thus we have
$$\gamma = \frac{7}{5} = 1.4.$$

For example, terrestrial air is primarily made up of diatomic gases (around 78% nitrogen, N_{2}, and 21% oxygen, O_{2}), and at standard conditions it can be considered to be an ideal gas. The above value of 1.4 is highly consistent with the measured adiabatic indices for dry air within a temperature range of 0–200 °C, exhibiting a deviation of only 0.2% (see tabulation above).

For a linear triatomic molecule such as CO_{2}, there are only 5 degrees of freedom (3 translations and 2 rotations), assuming vibrational modes are not excited. However, as mass increases and the frequency of vibrational modes decreases, vibrational degrees of freedom start to enter into the equation at far lower temperatures than is typically the case for diatomic molecules. For example, it requires a far larger temperature to excite the single vibrational mode for H_{2}, for which one quantum of vibration is a fairly large amount of energy, than for the bending or stretching vibrations of CO_{2}.

For a non-linear triatomic gas, such as water vapor, which has 3 translational and 3 rotational degrees of freedom, this model predicts
$$\gamma = \frac{8}{6} = 1.3333\ldots.$$

== Real-gas relations ==
As noted above, as temperature increases, higher-energy vibrational states become accessible to molecular gases, thus increasing the number of degrees of freedom and lowering γ. Conversely, as the temperature is lowered, rotational degrees of freedom may become unequally partitioned as well. As a result, both C_{P} and C_{V} increase with increasing temperature.

Despite this, if the density is fairly low and intermolecular forces are negligible, the two heat capacities may still continue to differ from each other by a fixed constant (as above, C_{P} = C_{V} + nR), which reflects the relatively constant PV difference in work done during expansion for constant pressure vs. constant volume conditions. Thus, the ratio of the two values, γ, decreases with increasing temperature.

However, when the gas density is sufficiently high and intermolecular forces are important, thermodynamic expressions may sometimes be used to accurately describe the relationship between the two heat capacities, as explained below. Unfortunately the situation can become considerably more complex if the temperature is sufficiently high for molecules to dissociate or carry out other chemical reactions, in which case thermodynamic expressions arising from simple equations of state may not be adequate.

=== Thermodynamic expressions ===
Values based on approximations (particularly C_{P} − C_{V} = nR) are in many cases not sufficiently accurate for practical engineering calculations, such as flow rates through pipes and valves at moderate to high pressures. An experimental value should be used rather than one based on this approximation, where possible. A rigorous value for the ratio C_{P}/C_{V} can also be calculated by determining C_{V} from the residual properties expressed as
$$C_P - C_V = -T \frac{\left(\frac{\partial V}{\partial T}\right)_P^2}{\left(\frac{\partial V}{\partial P}\right)_T} = -T \frac{\left(\frac{\partial P}{\partial T}\right)_V^2}{\left(\frac{\partial P}{\partial V}\right)_T}.$$

Values for C_{P} are readily available and recorded, but values for C_{V} need to be determined via relations such as these. See relations between specific heats for the derivation of the thermodynamic relations between the heat capacities.

The above definition is the approach used to develop rigorous expressions from equations of state (such as Peng–Robinson), which match experimental values so closely that there is little need to develop a database of ratios or C_{V} values. Values can also be determined through finite-difference approximation.

== Adiabatic process ==
This ratio gives the important relation for an isentropic (quasistatic, reversible, adiabatic process) process of a simple compressible calorically perfect ideal gas:

$$P V^\gamma = \text{const.}$$

Using the ideal gas law, $PV = nRT$:
$$P^{1-\gamma} T^\gamma = \text{const.}$$
$$T V^{\gamma-1} = \text{const.}$$

where P is the pressure of the gas, V is the volume, and T is the thermodynamic temperature.

In gas dynamics we are interested in the local relations between pressure, density and temperature, rather than considering a fixed quantity of gas. By considering the density $\rho = M/V$ as the inverse of the volume for a unit mass, we can take $\rho = 1/V$ in these relations. Since for constant entropy, $S$, we have $P \propto \rho^\gamma$, or $\ln P = \gamma \ln \rho + \mathrm{constant}$, it follows that
$$\gamma = \left(\frac{\partial \ln P}{\partial \ln \rho}\right)_{\!\!S}
= \frac{\rho}{P} \left(\frac{\partial P}{\partial \rho}\right)_{\!\!S}.$$

For an imperfect or non-ideal gas, Chandrasekhar defined three different adiabatic indices so that the adiabatic relations can be written in the same form as above; these are used in the theory of stellar structure:
$$\begin{align}
\Gamma_1      &= \left(\frac{\partial \ln P}{\partial \ln \rho}\right)_{\!\!S} = \frac{\rho}{P} \left(\frac{\partial P}{\partial \rho}\right)_{\!\!S}, \\[2pt]
1 - \Gamma_2^{-1} &= \left(\frac{\partial \ln T}{\partial \ln P}\right)_{\!\!S} = \frac{P}{T} \left(\frac{\partial T}{\partial P}\right)_{\!\!S}, \\[2pt]
\Gamma_3 - 1  &= \left(\frac{\partial \ln T}{\partial \ln \rho}\right)_{\!\!S} = \frac{\rho}{T} \left(\frac{\partial T}{\partial \rho}\right)_{\!\!S}.
\end{align}$$

All of these are equal to $\gamma$ in the case of an ideal gas.

== See also ==
- Relations between heat capacities
- Heat capacity
- Specific heat capacity
- Speed of sound
- Thermodynamic equations
- Thermodynamics
- Volumetric heat capacity
