= Molar heat capacity =

Intensive quantity, heat capacity per amount of substance

The molar heat capacity of a chemical substance is the amount of energy that must be added, in the form of heat, to one mole of the substance in order to cause an increase of one unit in its temperature. Alternatively, it is the heat capacity of a sample of the substance divided by the amount of substance of the sample, or the specific heat capacity of the substance times its molar mass. The SI unit of molar heat capacity is joule per kelvin per mole, J⋅K^{−1}⋅mol^{−1}.

Like specific heat, the measured molar heat capacity of a substance, especially a gas, may be significantly higher when the sample is allowed to expand as it is heated (at constant pressure, or isobaric) than when it is heated in a closed vessel that prevents expansion (at constant volume, or isochoric). The ratio between the two, however, is the same heat capacity ratio obtained from the corresponding specific heat capacities.

This property is most relevant in chemistry, when amounts of substances are often specified in moles rather than by mass or volume. The molar heat capacity generally increases with the molar mass, often varies with temperature and pressure, and is different for each state of matter. For example, at atmospheric pressure, the (isobaric) molar heat capacity of water just above the melting point is about 76 J⋅K^{−1}⋅mol^{−1}, but that of ice just below that point is about 37.84 J⋅K^{−1}⋅mol^{−1}. While the substance is undergoing a phase transition, such as melting or boiling, its molar heat capacity is technically infinite, because the heat goes into changing its state rather than raising its temperature. The concept is not appropriate for substances whose precise composition is not known, or whose molar mass is not well defined, such as polymers and oligomers of indeterminate molecular size.

A closely related property of a substance is the heat capacity per mole of atoms, or atom-molar heat capacity, in which the heat capacity of the sample is divided by the number of moles of atoms instead of moles of molecules. So, for example, the atom-molar heat capacity of water is 1/3 of its molar heat capacity, namely 25.3 J⋅K^{−1}⋅mol^{−1}.

In informal chemistry contexts, the molar heat capacity may be called just "heat capacity" or "specific heat". However, international standards now recommend that "specific heat capacity" always refer to capacity per unit of mass, to avoid possible confusion. Therefore, the word "molar", not "specific", should always be used for this quantity.

== Definition ==
The molar heat capacity of a substance, which may be denoted by c_{m}, is the heat capacity C of a sample of the substance divided by the amount (moles) n of the substance in the sample:

$$c_\text{m} = \frac{C}{n} = \frac{1}{n} \lim_{\Delta T \to 0} \frac{Q}{\Delta T},$$

where Q is the amount of heat needed to raise the temperature of the sample by ΔT. Obviously, this parameter cannot be computed when n is not known or defined.

Like the heat capacity of an object, the molar heat capacity of a substance may vary, sometimes substantially, depending on the starting temperature T of the sample and the pressure P applied to it. Therefore, it should be considered a function c_{m}(P, T) of those two variables.

These parameters are usually specified when giving the molar heat capacity of a substance. For example, "H_{2}O: 75.338 J⋅K^{−1}⋅mol^{−1} (25 °C, 101.325 kPa)" When not specified, published values of the molar heat capacity c_{m} generally are valid for some standard conditions for temperature and pressure.

However, the dependency of c_{m}(P, T) on starting temperature and pressure can often be ignored in practical contexts, e.g. when working in narrow ranges of those variables. In those contexts one can usually omit the qualifier (P, T) and approximate the molar heat capacity by a constant c_{m} suitable for those ranges.

Since the molar heat capacity of a substance is the specific heat c times the molar mass of the substance M/N, its numerical value in SI units is generally smaller than that of the specific heat. Paraffin wax, for example, has a specific heat of about 2500 J⋅K^{−1}⋅kg^{−1} but a molar heat capacity of about 600 J⋅K^{−1}⋅mol^{−1}.

The molar heat capacity is an "intensive" property of a substance, an intrinsic characteristic that does not depend on the size or shape of the amount in consideration. (The qualifier "specific" in front of an extensive property often indicates an intensive property derived from it.)

=== Variations ===
The injection of heat energy into a substance, besides raising its temperature, usually causes an increase in its volume and/or its pressure, depending on how the sample is confined. The choice made about the latter affects the measured molar heat capacity, even for the same starting pressure P and starting temperature T. Two particular choices are widely used:

- If the pressure is kept constant (for instance, at the ambient atmospheric pressure), and the sample is allowed to expand, the expansion generates work as the force from the pressure displaces the enclosure. That work must come from the heat energy provided. The value thus obtained is said to be the molar heat capacity at constant pressure (or isobaric), and is often denoted c_{P,m}, c_{p,m}, c_{P,m}, etc.
- On the other hand, if the expansion is prevented — for example by a sufficiently rigid enclosure, or by increasing the external pressure to counteract the internal one — no work is generated, and the heat energy that would have gone into it must instead contribute to the internal energy of the object, including raising its temperature by an extra amount. The value obtained this way is said to be the molar heat capacity at constant volume (or isochoric) and denoted c_{V,m}, c_{v,m}, c_{v,m}, etc.

The value of c_{V,m} is always less than the value of c_{P,m}. This difference is particularly notable in gases where values under constant pressure are typically 30% to 66.7% greater than those at constant volume.

All methods for the measurement of specific heat apply to molar heat capacity as well.

== Units ==
The SI unit of molar heat capacity heat is joule per kelvin per mole (J/(K⋅mol), J/(K mol), J K^{−1} mol^{−1}, etc.). Since an increment of temperature of one degree Celsius is the same as an increment of one kelvin, that is the same as joule per degree Celsius per mole (J/(°C⋅mol)).

In chemistry, heat amounts are still often measured in calories. Confusingly, two units with that name, denoted "cal" or "Cal", have been commonly used to measure amounts of heat:

- the "small calorie" (or "gram-calorie", "cal") is 4.184 J, exactly.
- The "grand calorie" (also "kilocalorie", "kilogram-calorie", or "food calorie"; "kcal" or "Cal") is 1000 small calories, that is, 4184 J, exactly.

When heat is measured in these units, the unit of specific heat is usually

1 cal/(°C⋅mol) ("small calorie") = 4.184 J⋅K^{−1}⋅mol^{−1}
1 kcal/(°C⋅mol) ("large calorie") = 4184 J⋅K^{−1}⋅mol^{−1}.

The molar heat capacity of a substance has the same dimension as the heat capacity of an object; namely, L^{2}⋅M⋅T^{−2}⋅Θ^{−1}, or M(L/T)^{2}/Θ. (Indeed, it is the heat capacity of the object that consists of an Avogadro number of molecules of the substance.) Therefore, the SI unit J⋅K^{−1}⋅mol^{−1} is equivalent to kilogram metre squared per second squared per kelvin per mole (kg⋅m^{2}⋅K^{−1}⋅s^{−2}⋅mol^{−1}).

== Physical basis ==
=== Monatomic gases ===
The temperature of a sample of a substance reflects the average kinetic energy of its constituent particles (atoms or molecules) relative to its center of mass. Quantum mechanics predicts that, at room temperature and ordinary pressures, an isolated atom in a gas cannot store any significant amount of energy except in the form of kinetic energy. Therefore, when a certain number N of atoms of a monatomic gas receives an input Q of heat energy, in a container of fixed volume, the kinetic energy of each atom will increase by Q/N, independently of the atom's mass. This assumption is the foundation of the theory of ideal gases.

In other words, that theory predicts that the molar heat capacity at constant volume c_{V,m} of all monatomic gases will be the same; specifically,

c_{V,m} = 3/2R

where R is the ideal gas constant, about 8.31446 J⋅K^{−1}⋅mol^{−1} (which is the product of the Boltzmann constant k_{B} and the Avogadro constant). And, indeed, the experimental values of c_{V,m} for the noble gases helium, neon, argon, krypton, and xenon (at 1 atm and 25 °C) are all 12.5 J⋅K^{−1}⋅mol^{−1}, which is 3/2R; even though their atomic weights range from 4 to 131.

The same theory predicts that the molar heat capacity of a monatomic gas at constant pressure will be

c_{P,m} = c_{V,m} + R = 5/2R

This prediction matches the experimental values, which, for helium through xenon, are 20.78, 20.79, 20.85, 20.95, and 21.01 J⋅K^{−1}⋅mol^{−1}, respectively; very close to the theoretical 5/2R = 20.78 J⋅K^{−1}⋅mol^{−1}.

Therefore, the specific heat (per unit of mass, not per mole) of a monatomic gas will be inversely proportional to its (adimensional) relative atomic mass A. That is, approximately,

c_{V} = (12470 J⋅K^{−1}⋅kg^{−1})/A c_{P} = (20786 J⋅K^{−1}⋅kg^{−1})/A

=== Polyatomic gases ===
Vibration of atoms in the molecule and rotation of the molecule store some of the energy (transferred to the molecule as heat) that otherwise would contribute to the molecule's kinetic energy.

==== Degrees of freedom ====
A polyatomic molecule (consisting of two or more atoms bound together) can store heat energy in other forms besides its kinetic energy. These forms include rotation of the molecule, and vibration of the atoms relative to its center of mass.

These extra degrees of freedom contribute to the molar heat capacity of the substance. Namely, when heat energy is injected into a gas with polyatomic molecules, only part of it will go into increasing their kinetic energy, and hence the temperature; the rest will go to into those other degrees of freedom. Thus, in order to achieve the same increase in temperature, more heat energy will have to be provided to a mol of that substance than to a mol of a monatomic gas. Substances with high atomic count per molecule, like octane, can therefore have a very large heat capacity per mole, and yet a relatively small specific heat (per unit mass).

If the molecule could be entirely described using classical mechanics, then the theorem of equipartition of energy could be used to predict that each degree of freedom would have an average energy in the amount of 1/2kT, where k is the Boltzmann constant, and T is the temperature. If the number of degrees of freedom of the molecule is f, then each molecule would be holding, on average, a total energy equal to 1/2fkT. Then the molar heat capacity (at constant volume) would be

c_{V,m} = 1/2fR

where R is the ideal gas constant. According to Mayer's relation, the molar heat capacity at constant pressure would be

c_{P,m} = c_{V,m} + R = 1/2fR + R = 1/2(f + 2)R

Thus, each additional degree of freedom will contribute 1/2R to the molar heat capacity of the gas (both c_{V,m} and c_{P,m}).

In particular, each molecule of a monatomic gas has only f = 3 degrees of freedom, namely the components of its velocity vector; therefore c_{V,m} = 3/2R and c_{P,m} = 5/2R.

==== Rotational modes of a diatomic molecule ====
For example, the molar heat capacity of nitrogen N_{2} at constant volume is 20.6 J⋅K^{−1}⋅mol^{−1} (at 15 °C, 1 atm), which is 2.49 R. From the theoretical equation c_{V,m} = 1/2fR, one concludes that each molecule has f = 5 degrees of freedom. These turn out to be three degrees of the molecule's velocity vector, plus two degrees from its rotation about an axis through the center of mass and perpendicular to the line of the two atoms. The degrees of freedom due to translations and rotations are called the rigid degrees of freedom, since they do not involve any deformation of the molecule.

Because of those two extra degrees of freedom, the molar heat capacity c_{V,m} of N_{2} (20.6 J⋅K^{−1}⋅mol^{−1}) is greater than that of an hypothetical monatomic gas (12.5 J⋅K^{−1}⋅mol^{−1}) by a factor of 5/3.

==== Frozen and active degrees of freedom ====
According to classical mechanics, a diatomic molecule like nitrogen should have more degrees of internal freedom, corresponding to vibration of the two atoms that stretch and compress the bond between them.

For thermodynamic purposes, each direction in which an atom can independently vibrate relative to the rest of the molecule introduces two degrees of freedom: one associated with the potential energy from distorting the bonds, and one for the kinetic energy of the atom's motion. In a diatomic molecule like N_{2}, there is only one direction for the vibration, and the motions of the two atoms must be opposite but equal; so there are only two degrees of vibrational freedom. That would bring f up to 7, and c_{V,m} to 3.5 R.

The reason why these vibrations are not absorbing their expected fraction of heat energy input is provided by quantum mechanics. According to that theory, the energy stored in each degree of freedom must increase or decrease only in certain amounts (quanta). Therefore, if the temperature T of the system is not high enough, the average energy that would be available for some of the theoretical degrees of freedom (kT/f) may be less than the corresponding minimum quantum. If the temperature is low enough, that may be the case for practically all molecules. One then says that those degrees of freedom are "frozen". The molar heat capacity of the gas will then be determined only by the "active" degrees of freedom — that, for most molecules, can receive enough energy to overcome that quantum threshold.

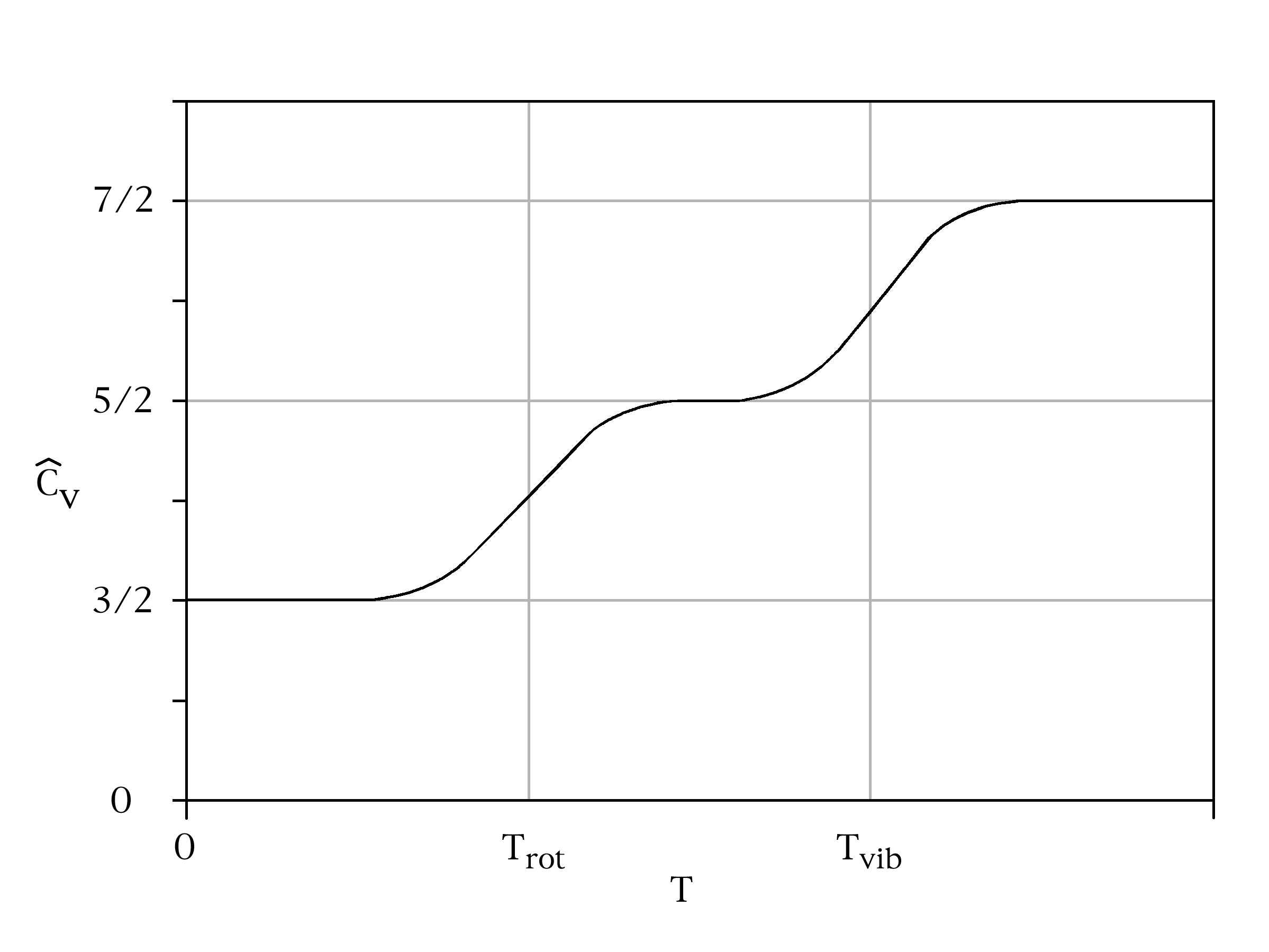
Constant-volume specific heat capacity of a diatomic gas (idealised). As temperature increases, heat capacity goes from 3/2R (translation contribution only), to 5/2R (translation plus rotation), finally to a maximum of 7/2R (translation + rotation + vibration)

For each degree of freedom, there is an approximate critical temperature at which it "thaws" ("unfreezes") and becomes active, thus being able to hold heat energy. For the three translational degrees of freedom of molecules in a gas, this critical temperature is extremely small, so they can be assumed to be always active. For the rotational degrees of freedom, the thawing temperature is usually a few tens of kelvins (although with a very light molecule such as hydrogen the rotational energy levels will be spaced so widely that rotational heat capacity may not completely "unfreeze" until considerably higher temperatures are reached). Vibration modes of diatomic molecules generally start to activate only well above room temperature.

In the case of nitrogen, the rotational degrees of freedom are fully active already at −173 °C (100 K, just 23 K above the boiling point). On the other hand, the vibration modes only start to become active around 350 K (77 °C) Accordingly, the molar heat capacity c_{P,m} is nearly constant at 29.1 J⋅K^{−1}⋅mol^{−1} from 100 K to about 300 °C. At about that temperature, it starts to increase rapidly, then it slows down again. It is 35.5 J⋅K^{−1}⋅mol^{−1} at 1500 °C, 36.9 at 2500 °C, and 37.5 at 3500 °C. The last value corresponds almost exactly to the predicted value for f = 7.

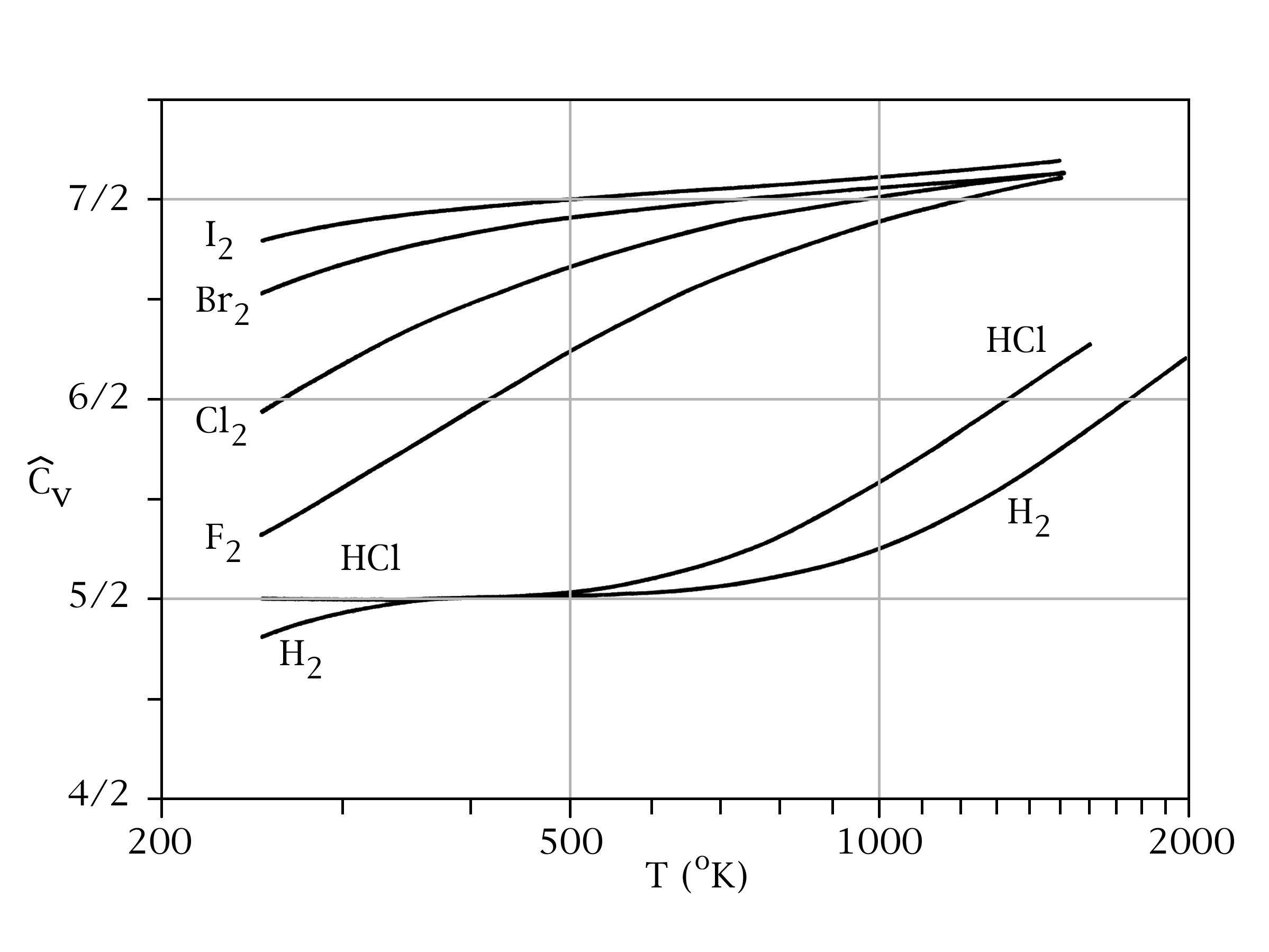
Constant-volume specific heat capacity of diatomic gases (real gases) between about 200 K and 2000 K. This temperature range is not large enough to include both quantum transitions in all gases. Instead, at 200 K, all but hydrogen are fully rotationally excited, so all have at least 5/2R heat capacity. (Hydrogen is already below 5/2, but it will require cryogenic conditions for even H_{2} to fall to 3/2R). Further, only the heavier gases fully reach 7/2R at the highest temperature, due to the relatively small vibrational energy spacing of these molecules. HCl and H_{2} begin to make the transition above 500 K, but have not achieved it by 1000 K, since their vibrational energy level spacing is too wide to fully participate in heat capacity, even at this temperature.

The following is a table of some constant-pressure molar heat capacities c_{P,m} of various diatomic gases at standard temperature (25 °C = 298 K), at 500 °C, and at 5000 °C, and the apparent number of degrees of freedom f^{*} estimated by the formula f^{*} = 2c_{P,m}/R − 2:

| | 25 °C | | 500 °C | | 5000 °C | | |
| Gas | c_{P,m} J⋅K^{−1}⋅mol^{−1} | f^{*} | c_{P,m} J⋅K^{−1}⋅mol^{−1} | f^{*} | c_{P,m} J⋅K^{−1}⋅mol^{−1} | f^{*} | |
| H_{2} | 28.9 | 5.0 | 29.6 | 5.1 | 41.2 | 7.9 | Not saturated. |
| CO | 29.1 | 5.0 | 31.7 | 5.6 | 38.1 | 7.2 | Saturated. |
| N_{2} | 29.1 | 5.0 | 31.3 | 5.5 | 38.0 | 7.1 | Saturated. |
| Cl_{2} | 34.0 | 6.2 | 37.0 | 6.9 | 39.6 | 7.5 | Max 41.3 at ~3700 C. |
| Br_{2} (vapour) | (*)36.4 | 6.8 | 37.5 | 7.0 | 39.2 | 7.4 | Max 41.6 at ~3000 C. |

(*) At 59 C (boiling point)

The quantum harmonic oscillator approximation implies that the spacing of energy levels of vibrational modes are inversely proportional to the square root of the reduced mass of the atoms composing the diatomic molecule. This fact explains why the vibrational modes of heavier molecules like Br_{2} are active at lower temperatures. The molar heat capacity of Br_{2} at room temperature is consistent with f = 7 degrees of freedom, the maximum for a diatomic molecule. At high enough temperatures, all diatomic gases approach this value.

==== Rotational modes of single atoms ====
Quantum mechanics also explains why the specific heat of monatomic gases is well predicted by the ideal gas theory with the assumption that each molecule is a point mass that has only the f = 3 translational degrees of freedom.

According to classical mechanics, since atoms have non-zero size, they should also have three rotational degrees of freedom, or f = 6 in total. Likewise, the diatomic nitrogen molecule should have an additional rotation mode, namely about the line of the two atoms; and thus have f = 6 too. In the classical view, each of these modes should store an equal share of the heat energy.

However, according to quantum mechanics, the energy difference between the allowed (quantized) rotation states is inversely proportional to the moment of inertia about the corresponding axis of rotation. Because the moment of inertia of a single atom is exceedingly small, the activation temperature for its rotational modes is extremely high. The same applies to the moment of inertia of a diatomic molecule (or a linear polyatomic one) about the internuclear axis, which is why that mode of rotation is not active in general.

On the other hand, electrons and nuclei can exist in excited states and, in a few exceptional cases, they may be active even at room temperature, or even at cryogenic temperatures.

==== Polyatomic gases ====
The set of all possible ways to infinitesimally displace the n atoms of a polyatomic gas molecule is a linear space of dimension 3n, because each atom can be independently displaced in each of three orthogonal axis directions. However, some three of these dimensions are just translation of the molecule by an infinitesimal displacement vector, and others are just rigid rotations of it by an infinitesimal angle about some axis. Still others may correspond to relative rotation of two parts of the molecule about a single bond that connects them.

The independent deformation modes—linearly independent ways to actually deform the molecule, that strain its bonds—are only the remaining dimensions of this space. As in the case diatomic molecules, each of these deformation modes counts as two vibrational degrees of freedom for energy storage purposes: one for the potential energy stored in the strained bonds, and one for the extra kinetic energy of the atoms as they vibrate about the rest configuration of the molecule.

In particular, if the molecule is linear (with all atoms on a straight line), it has only two non-trivial rotation modes, since rotation about its own axis does not displace any atom. Therefore, it has 3n − 5 actual deformation modes. The number of energy-storing degrees of freedom is then f = 3 + 2 + 2(3n − 5) = 6n − 5.

For example, the linear nitrous oxide molecule N≡N=O (with n = 3) has 3n − 5 = 4 independent infinitesimal deformation modes. Two of them can be described as stretching one of the bonds while the other retains its normal length. The other two can be identified which the molecule bends at the central atom, in the two directions that are orthogonal to its axis. In each mode, one should assume that the atoms get displaced so that the center of mass remains stationary and there is no rotation. The molecule then has f = 6n − 5 = 13 total energy-storing degrees of freedom (3 translational, 2 rotational, 8 vibrational). At high enough temperature, its molar heat capacity then should be c_{P,m} = 7.5 R = 62.63 J⋅K^{−1}⋅mol^{−1}. For cyanogen N≡C−C≡N and acetylene H−C≡C−H (n = 4) the same analysis yields f = 19 and predicts c_{P,m} = 10.5 R = 87.3 J⋅K^{−1}⋅mol^{−1}.

A molecule with n atoms that is rigid and not linear has 3 translation modes and 3 non-trivial rotation modes, hence only 3n − 6 deformation modes. It therefore has f = 3 + 3 + 2(3n − 6) = 6n − 6 energy-absorbing degrees of freedom (one less than a linear molecule with the same atom count). Water H_{2}O (n = 3) is bent in its non-strained state, therefore it is predicted to have f = 12 degrees of freedom. Methane CH_{4} (n = 5) is tridimensional, and the formula predicts f = 24.

Ethane H_{3}C−CH_{3} (n = 8) has 4 degrees of rotational freedom: two about axes that are perpendicular to the central bond, and two more because each methyl group can rotate independently about that bond, with negligible resistance. Therefore, the number of independent deformation modes is 3n − 7, which gives f = 3 + 4 + 2(3n − 7) = 6n − 7 = 41.

The following table shows the experimental molar heat capacities at constant pressure c_{P,m} of the above polyatomic gases at standard temperature (25 °C = 298 K), at 500 °C, and at 5000 °C, and the apparent number of degrees of freedom f^{*} estimated by the formula f^{*} = 2c_{P,m}/R − 2:

| | 25 °C | | 500 °C | | 5000 °C | | | |
| Gas | c_{P,m} J⋅K^{−1}⋅mol^{−1} | f^{*} | c_{P,m} J⋅K^{−1}⋅mol^{−1} | f^{*} | c_{P,m} J⋅K^{−1}⋅mol^{−1} | f^{*} | f | Notes |
| N≡N=O | 38.6 | 7.3 | 51.8 | 10.5 | 62.0 | 12.9 | 13 | |
| N≡C–C≡N | 56.7 | 11.6 | 72.3 | 15.4 | 86.7 | 18.9 | 19 | |
| H–C≡C–H | 44.0 | 8.6 | 63.2 | 13.2 | 92.9 | 20.3 | 19 | |
| H_{2}O | — | — | 38.4 | 7.2 | 59.7 | 12.4 | 12 | |
| CH_{4} | 35.7 | 6.6 | 61.6 | 12.8 | 105.7 | 23.4 | 24 | |
| H_{3}C–CH_{3} | 52.5 | 10.6 | 105.6 | 23.4 | 168.7 | (*)38.6 | 41 | |

(*) At 3000C

=== Specific heat of solids ===
The dimensionless heat capacity divided by three, as a function of temperature as predicted by the Debye model and by Einstein's earlier model. The horizontal axis is the temperature divided by the Debye temperature. Note that, as expected, the dimensionless heat capacity is zero at absolute zero, and rises to a value of three as the temperature becomes much larger than the Debye temperature. The red line corresponds to the classical limit of the Dulong–Petit law

In most solids (but not all), the molecules have a fixed mean position and orientation, and therefore the only degrees of freedom available are the vibrations of the atoms. Thus the specific heat is proportional to the number of atoms (not molecules) per unit of mass, which is the Dulong–Petit law. Other contributions may come from magnetic and electronic degrees of freedom in solids, but these rarely make substantial contributions near room temperature. Since each atom of the solid contributes one independent vibration mode, the number of degrees of freedom in n atoms is 6n. Therefore, the heat capacity of a sample of a solid substance is expected to be 3RN_{a}, or (24.94 J/K)N_{a}, where N_{a} is the number of moles of atoms in the sample, not molecules. Said another way, the atom-molar heat capacity of a solid substance is expected to be 3R = 24.94 J⋅K^{−1}⋅mol^{−1}, where a "mol" denotes an amount of the solid that contains the Avogadro number of atoms.

It follows that, in molecular solids, the heat capacity per mole of molecules will usually be close to 3nR, where n is the number of atoms per molecule.

Thus n atoms of a solid should in principle store twice as much energy as n atoms of a monatomic gas. One way to look at this result is to observe that the monatomic gas can only store energy as kinetic energy of the atoms, whereas the solid can store it also as potential energy of the bonds strained by the vibrations. The atom-molar heat capacity of a polyatomic gas approaches that of a solid as the number n of atoms per molecule increases.

As in the case of gases, some of the vibration modes will be "frozen out" at low temperatures, especially in solids with light and tightly bound atoms, causing the atom-molar heat capacity to be less than this theoretical limit. Indeed, the atom-molar (or specific) heat capacity of a solid substance tends toward zero, as the temperature approaches absolute zero.

==== Dulong–Petit law ====
As predicted by the above analysis, the heat capacity per mole of atoms, rather than per mole of molecules, is found to be remarkably constant for all solid substances at high temperatures. This relationship was noticed empirically in 1819, and is called the Dulong–Petit law, after its two discoverers. This discovery was an important argument in support of the atomic theory of matter.

Indeed, for solid metallic chemical elements at room temperature, atom-molar heat capacities range from about 2.8 R to 3.4 R. Large exceptions at the lower end involve solids composed of relatively low-mass, tightly bonded atoms, such as beryllium (2.0 R, only of 66% of the theoretical value), and diamond (0.735 R, only 24%). Those conditions imply larger quantum vibrational energy spacing, thus many vibrational modes are "frozen out" at room temperature. Water ice close to the melting point, too, has an anomalously low heat capacity per atom (1.5 R, only 50% of the theoretical value).

At the higher end of possible heat capacities, heat capacity may exceed R by modest amounts, due to contributions from anharmonic vibrations in solids, and sometimes a modest contribution from conduction electrons in metals. These are not degrees of freedom treated in the Einstein or Debye theories.

==== Specific heat of solid elements ====
Since the bulk density of a solid chemical element is strongly related to its molar mass, there exists a noticeable inverse correlation between a solid's density and its specific heat capacity on a per-mass basis. This is due to a very approximate tendency of atoms of most elements to be about the same size, despite much wider variations in density and atomic weight. These two factors (constancy of atomic volume and constancy of mole-specific heat capacity) result in a good correlation between the volume of any given solid chemical element and its total heat capacity.

Another way of stating this, is that the volume-specific heat capacity (volumetric heat capacity) of solid elements is roughly a constant. The molar volume of solid elements is very roughly constant, and (even more reliably) so also is the molar heat capacity for most solid substances. These two factors determine the volumetric heat capacity, which as a bulk property may be striking in consistency. For example, the element uranium is a metal that has a density almost 36 times that of the metal lithium, but uranium's specific heat capacity on a volumetric basis (i.e. per given volume of metal) is only 18% larger than lithium's.

However, the average atomic volume in solid elements is not quite constant, so there are deviations from this principle. For instance, arsenic, which is only 14.5% less dense than antimony, has nearly 59% more specific heat capacity on a mass basis. In other words; even though an ingot of arsenic is only about 17% larger than an antimony one of the same mass, it absorbs about 59% more heat for a given temperature rise. The heat capacity ratios of the two substances closely follows the ratios of their molar volumes (the ratios of numbers of atoms in the same volume of each substance); the departure from the correlation to simple volumes, in this case, is due to lighter arsenic atoms being significantly more closely packed than antimony atoms, instead of similar size. In other words, similar-sized atoms would cause a mole of arsenic to be 63% larger than a mole of antimony, with a correspondingly lower density, allowing its volume to more closely mirror its heat capacity behavior.

==== Effect of impurities ====
Sometimes small impurity concentrations can greatly affect the specific heat, for example in semiconducting ferromagnetic alloys.

==== Specific heat of liquids ====
A general theory of the heat capacity of liquids has not yet been achieved, and is still an active area of research. It was long thought that phonon theory is not able to explain the heat capacity of liquids, since liquids only sustain longitudinal, but not transverse phonons, which in solids are responsible for 2/3 of the heat capacity. However, Brillouin scattering experiments with neutrons and with X-rays, confirming an intuition of Yakov Frenkel, have shown that transverse phonons do exist in liquids, albeit restricted to frequencies above a threshold called the Frenkel frequency. Since most energy is contained in these high-frequency modes, a simple modification of the Debye model is sufficient to yield a good approximation to experimental heat capacities of simple liquids.

Because of high crystal binding energies, the effects of vibrational mode freezing are observed in solids more often than liquids: for example the heat capacity of liquid water is twice that of ice at near the same temperature, and is again close to the 3R per mole of atoms of the Dulong–Petit theoretical maximum.

Amorphous materials can be considered a type of liquid at temperatures above the glass transition temperature. Below the glass transition temperature amorphous materials are in the solid (glassy) state form. The specific heat has characteristic discontinuities at the glass transition temperature which are caused by the absence in the glassy state of percolating clusters made of broken bonds (configurons) that are present only in the liquid phase. Above the glass transition temperature percolating clusters formed by broken bonds enable a more floppy structure and hence a larger degree of freedom for atomic motion which results in a higher heat capacity of liquids. Below the glass transition temperature there are no extended clusters of broken bonds and the heat capacity is smaller because the solid-state (glassy) structure of amorphous material is more rigid. The discontinuities in the heat capacity are typically used to detect the glass transition temperature where a supercooled liquid transforms to a glass.

==== Effect of hydrogen bonds ====
Hydrogen-containing polar molecules like ethanol, ammonia, and water have powerful, intermolecular hydrogen bonds when in their liquid phase. These bonds provide another place where heat may be stored as potential energy of vibration, even at comparatively low temperatures. Hydrogen bonds account for the fact that liquid water stores nearly the theoretical limit of 3R per mole of atoms, even at relatively low temperatures (i.e. near the freezing point of water).

== See also ==
- Quantum statistical mechanics
- Heat capacity ratio
- Statistical mechanics
- Thermodynamic equations
- Thermodynamic databases for pure substances
- Heat equation
- Heat transfer coefficient
- Heat of mixing
- Latent heat
- Material properties (thermodynamics)
- Joback method (Estimation of heat capacities)
- Specific heat of melting (Enthalpy of fusion)
- Specific heat of vaporization (Enthalpy of vaporization)
- Volumetric heat capacity
- Thermal mass
- R-value (insulation)
- Storage heater
- Frenkel line
