= Table of specific heat capacities =

The table of specific heat capacities gives the volumetric heat capacity as well as the specific heat capacity of some substances and engineering materials, and (when applicable) the molar heat capacity.

Generally, the most notable constant parameter is the volumetric heat capacity (at least for solids) which is around the value of 3 megajoule per cubic meter per kelvin:

$$\rho c_p \simeq 3\,\text{MJ}/(\text{m}^3{\cdot}\text{K})\quad   \text{(solid)}$$

Note that the especially high molar values, as for paraffin, gasoline, water and ammonia, result from calculating specific heats in terms of moles of molecules. If specific heat is expressed per mole of atoms for these substances, none of the constant-volume values exceed, to any large extent, the theoretical Dulong–Petit limit of 25 J⋅mol^{−1}⋅K^{−1} = 3 R per mole of atoms (see the last column of this table). For example, Paraffin has very large molecules and thus a high heat capacity per mole, but as a substance it does not have remarkable heat capacity in terms of volume, mass, or atom-mol (which is just 1.41 R per mole of atoms, or less than half of most solids, in terms of heat capacity per atom). The Dulong–Petit limit also explains why dense substances, such as lead, which have very heavy atoms, rank very low in mass heat capacity.

In the last column, major departures of solids at standard temperatures from the Dulong–Petit law value of 3 R, are usually due to low atomic weight plus high bond strength (as in diamond) causing some vibration modes to have too much energy to be available to store thermal energy at the measured temperature. For gases, departure from 3 R per mole of atoms is generally due to two factors: (1) failure of the higher quantum-energy-spaced vibration modes in gas molecules to be excited at room temperature, and (2) loss of potential energy degree of freedom for small gas molecules, simply because most of their atoms are not bonded maximally in space to other atoms, as happens in many solids.

Table of specific heat capacities at 25 °C (298 K) unless otherwise noted. Notable minima and maxima are shown in maroon.
Substance	Phase	Isobaric mass heat capacity c_{P} J⋅g^{−1}⋅K^{−1}	Molar heat capacity, C_{P,m} and C_{V,m} J⋅mol^{−1}⋅K^{−1}		Isobaric volumetric heat capacity C_{P,v} J⋅cm^{−3}⋅K^{−1}	Isochoric molar by atom heat capacity C_{V,am} mol-atom^{−1}
Substance	Phase	Isobaric mass heat capacity c_{P} J⋅g^{−1}⋅K^{−1}	Isobaric	Isochoric	Isobaric volumetric heat capacity C_{P,v} J⋅cm^{−3}⋅K^{−1}	Isochoric molar by atom heat capacity C_{V,am} mol-atom^{−1}
Air (Sea level, dry, 0 °C (273.15 K))	gas	1.0035	29.070	20.764	0.001297	
Air (typical room conditions^{A})	gas	1.012	29.190	20.850	0.00121	
Aluminium	solid	0.897	24.200		2.422	2.91 R
Ammonia	liquid	4.700	80.080		3.260	3.21 R
Animal tissue (incl. human)	mixed	3.500			3.700	
Antimony	solid	0.207	25.200		1.386	3.03 R
Argon	gas	0.5203	20.786	12.471		
Arsenic	solid	0.328	24.600		1.878	2.96 R
Beryllium	solid	1.820	16.400		3.367	1.97 R
Bismuth	solid	0.123	25.700		1.200	3.09 R
Cadmium	solid	0.231	26.020		2.000	3.13 R
Carbon dioxide CO_{2}	gas	0.839^{B}	36.940	28.460		
Chromium	solid	0.449	23.350		3.210	2.81 R
Copper	solid	0.385	24.470		3.450	2.94 R
Diamond	solid	0.509	6.115		1.782	0.74 R
Ethanol	liquid	2.440	112		1.925	
Gasoline (octane)	liquid	2.220	228		1.640	
Glass	solid	0.840			2.100	
Gold	solid	0.129	25.420		2.492	3.05 R
Granite	solid	0.790			2.170	
Graphite	solid	0.710	8.530		1.534	1.03 R
Helium	gas	5.193	20.786	12.471		
Hydrogen	gas	14.300	28.820			
Hydrogen sulfide H_{2}S	gas	1.015^{B}	34.600			
Iron	solid	0.449	25.090		3.537	3.02 R
Lead	solid	0.129	26.400		1.440	3.18 R
Lithium	solid	3.580	24.800		1.912	2.98 R
Lithium at 181 °C	solid(?)	4.233				
Lithium at 181 °C	liquid	4.379	30.330		2.242	3.65 R
Magnesium	solid	1.020	24.900		1.773	2.99 R
Mercury	liquid	0.1395	27.980		1.888	3.36 R
Methane at 2 °C	gas	2.191	35.690			
Methanol	liquid	2.140		68.620	1.695	
Molten salt (142–540 °C)	liquid	1.560			2.620	
Nitrogen	gas	1.040	29.120	20.800		
Neon	gas	1.030	20.786	12.471		
Oxygen	gas	0.918	29.380	21.000		
Paraffin wax C_{25}H_{52}	solid	2.500	900		2.325	
Polyethylene (rotomolding grade)	solid	2.302			2.150	
Silica (fused)	solid	0.703	42.200		1.547	
Silver	solid	0.233	24.900		2.440	2.99 R
Sodium	solid	1.230	28.230		1.190	3.39 R
Steel	solid	0.466			3.756	
Tin	solid	0.227	27.112		1.659	3.26 R
Titanium	solid	0.523	26.060		2.638	3.13 R
Tungsten	solid	0.134	24.800		2.580	2.98 R
Uranium	solid	0.116	27.700		2.216	3.33 R
Water at 100 °C (steam)	gas	2.030	36.500	27.500	1.530	
Water at 25 °C	liquid	4.181	75.340	74.550	4.138	
Water at 100 °C	liquid	4.216	75.950	67.900	3.770	
Water at −10 °C (ice)	solid	2.050	38.090		1.938	
Zinc	solid	0.387	25.200		2.760	3.03 R

^{A} Assuming an altitude of 194 metres above mean sea level (the worldwide median altitude of human habitation), an indoor temperature of 23 °C, a dewpoint of 9 °C (40.85% relative humidity), and 760 mmHg sea level–corrected barometric pressure (molar water vapor content = 1.16%).

^{B} Calculated values
*Derived data by calculation. This is for water-rich tissues such as brain. The whole-body average figure for mammals is approximately 2.9 J⋅cm^{−3}⋅K^{−1}

== Mass heat capacity of building materials ==
(Usually of interest to builders and solar)

Mass heat capacity of building materials
Substance	Phase	c_{P} J⋅g^{−1}⋅K^{−1}
Asphalt	solid	0.920
Brick	solid	0.840
Concrete	solid	0.880
Glass, silica	liquid	0.840
Glass, crown	liquid	0.670
Glass, flint	liquid	0.503
Glass, borosilicate	liquid	0.753
Granite	solid	0.790
Gypsum	solid	1.090
Marble, mica	solid	0.880
Sand	solid	0.835
Soil	solid	0.800
Water	liquid	4.181
Wood	solid	1.7 (1.2 to 2.9)
Substance	Phase	c_{P} J⋅g^{−1}⋅K^{−1}

== Human body ==
The specific heat of the human body calculated from the measured values of individual tissues is 2.98 J · g^{−1}· K^{−1}. This is 17% lower than the earlier, more widely used value based on non-measured values of 3.47 J · g^{−1}· K^{−1}. The contribution of the muscle to the specific heat of the body is approximately 47%, and the contribution of the fat and skin is approximately 24%. The specific heat of tissues range from ~0.7 J · g^{−1} · K^{−1} for tooth (enamel) to 4.2 J · g^{−1} · K^{−1} for eye (sclera).

== See also ==
- List of thermal conductivities
