= Relations between heat capacities =

Equations definiting head capacities in thermodynamics

In thermodynamics, the heat capacity at constant volume, $C_{V}$, and the heat capacity at constant pressure, $C_{P}$, are extensive properties that have the magnitude of energy divided by temperature.

== Relations ==
The laws of thermodynamics imply the following relations between these two heat capacities (Gaskell 2003:23):

$$C_P - C_V= V T\frac{\alpha^2}{\beta_T}\,$$

$$\frac{C_P}{C_V} = \frac{\beta_T}{\beta_S}\,$$

Here $\alpha$ is the thermal expansion coefficient:

$$\alpha=\frac{1}{V}\left(\frac{\partial V}{\partial T}\right)_{P}\,$$

$\beta_{T}$ is the isothermal compressibility (the inverse of the bulk modulus):

$$\beta_{T}=-\frac{1}{V}\left(\frac{\partial V}{\partial P}\right)_{T}\,$$

and $\beta_{S}$ is the isentropic compressibility:

$$\beta_{S}=-\frac{1}{V}\left(\frac{\partial V}{\partial P}\right)_{S}\,$$

A corresponding expression for the difference in specific heat capacities (intensive properties) at constant volume and constant pressure is:

$$c_p - c_v = \frac{T \alpha^2}{\rho \beta_T}$$

where ρ is the density of the substance under the applicable conditions.

The corresponding expression for the ratio of specific heat capacities remains the same since the thermodynamic system size-dependent quantities, whether on a per mass or per mole basis, cancel out in the ratio because specific heat capacities are intensive properties. Thus:

$$\frac{c_{p}}{c_{v}}=\frac{\beta_{T}}{\beta_{S}}\,$$

The difference relation allows one to obtain the heat capacity for solids at constant volume which is not readily measured in terms of quantities that are more easily measured. The ratio relation allows one to express the isentropic compressibility in terms of the heat capacity ratio.

== Derivation ==
If an infinitesimally small amount of heat $\delta Q$ is supplied to a system in a reversible way then, according to the second law of thermodynamics, the entropy change of the system is given by:

$$dS = \frac{\delta Q}{T}\,$$

Since

$$\delta Q = C dT\,$$

where C is the heat capacity, it follows that:

$$T dS = C dT\,$$

The heat capacity depends on how the external variables of the system are changed when the heat is supplied. If the only external variable of the system is the volume, then we can write:

$$dS = \left(\frac{\partial S}{\partial T}\right)_{V}dT + \left(\frac{\partial S}{\partial V}\right)_{T}dV$$

From this follows:

$$C_{V}=T\left(\frac{\partial S}{\partial T}\right)_{V}\,$$

Expressing dS in terms of dT and dP similarly as above leads to the expression:

$$C_{P}=T\left(\frac{\partial S}{\partial T}\right)_{P}\,$$

One can find the above expression for $C_{P}-C_{V}$ by expressing dV in terms of dP and dT in the above expression for dS.

$$dV = \left(\frac{\partial V}{\partial T}\right)_{P}dT+\left(\frac{\partial V}{\partial P}\right)_{T}dP\,$$

results in

$$dS = \left[\left(\frac{\partial S}{\partial T}\right)_{V}+ \left(\frac{\partial S}{\partial V}\right)_{T}\left(\frac{\partial V}{\partial T}\right)_{P}\right]dT+\left(\frac{\partial S}{\partial V}\right)_{T}\left(\frac{\partial V}{\partial P}\right)_{T}dP$$

and it follows:

$$\left(\frac{\partial S}{\partial T}\right)_{P} = \left(\frac{\partial S}{\partial T}\right)_{V}+ \left(\frac{\partial S}{\partial V}\right)_{T}\left(\frac{\partial V}{\partial T}\right)_{P}\,$$

Therefore,

$$C_{P} - C_{V} = T\left(\frac{\partial S}{\partial V}\right)_{T}\left(\frac{\partial V}{\partial T}\right)_{P}=VT\alpha\left(\frac{\partial S}{\partial V}\right)_{T}\,$$

The partial derivative $\left(\frac{\partial S}{\partial V}\right)_{T}$ can be rewritten in terms of variables that do not involve the entropy using a suitable Maxwell relation. These relations follow from the fundamental thermodynamic relation:

$$dE = T dS - P dV\,$$

It follows from this that the differential of the Helmholtz free energy $F = E - T S$ is:

$$dF = -S dT - P dV\,$$

This means that

$$-S = \left(\frac{\partial F}{\partial T}\right)_{V}\,$$

and

$$-P = \left(\frac{\partial F}{\partial V}\right)_{T}\,$$

The symmetry of second derivatives of F with respect to T and V then implies

$$\left(\frac{\partial S}{\partial V}\right)_{T} =\left(\frac{\partial P}{\partial T}\right)_{V}\,$$

allowing one to write:

$$C_{P} - C_{V} = VT\alpha\left(\frac{\partial P}{\partial T}\right)_{V}\,$$

The r.h.s. contains a derivative at constant volume, which can be difficult to measure. It can be rewritten as follows. In general,

$$dV= \left(\frac{\partial V}{\partial P}\right)_{T}dP+\left(\frac{\partial V}{\partial T}\right)_{P}dT\,$$

Since the partial derivative $\left(\frac{\partial P}{\partial T}\right)_{V}$ is just the ratio of dP and dT for dV = 0, one can obtain this by putting dV = 0 in the above equation and solving for this ratio:

$$\left(\frac{\partial P}{\partial T}\right)_{V}=-\frac{\left(\frac{\partial V}{\partial T}\right)_{P}}{\left(\frac{\partial V}{\partial P}\right)_{T}}=\frac{\alpha}{\beta_{T}}\,$$

which yields the expression:

$$C_{P} - C_{V}= V T\frac{\alpha^2}{\beta_{T}}\,$$

The expression for the ratio of the heat capacities can be obtained as follows:

$$\frac{C_{P}}{C_{V}} = \frac{\left(\frac{\partial S}{\partial T}\right)_{P}}{\left(\frac{\partial S}{\partial T}\right)_{V}}\,$$

The partial derivative in the numerator can be expressed as a ratio of partial derivatives of the pressure w.r.t. temperature and entropy. If in the relation

$$dP = \left(\frac{\partial P}{\partial S}\right)_{T}dS+\left(\frac{\partial P}{\partial T}\right)_{S} dT\,$$

we put $dP = 0$ and solve for the ratio $\frac{dS}{dT}$ we obtain $\left(\frac{\partial S}{\partial T}\right)_{P}$. Doing so gives:

$$\left(\frac{\partial S}{\partial T}\right)_{P}=-\frac{\left(\frac{\partial P}{\partial T}\right)_{S}}{\left(\frac{\partial P}{\partial S}\right)_{T}}\,$$

One can similarly rewrite the partial derivative $\left(\frac{\partial S}{\partial T}\right)_{V}$ by expressing dV in terms of dS and dT, putting dV equal to zero and solving for the ratio $\frac{dS}{dT}$. When one substitutes that expression in the heat capacity ratio expressed as the ratio of the partial derivatives of the entropy above, it follows:

$$\frac{C_{P}}{C_{V}}=\frac{\left(\frac{\partial P}{\partial T}\right)_{S}}{\left(\frac{\partial P}{\partial S}\right)_{T}}
\frac{\left(\frac{\partial V}{\partial S}\right)_{T}}{\left(\frac{\partial V}{\partial T}\right)_{S}}\,$$

Taking together the two derivatives at constant S:

$$\frac{\left(\frac{\partial P}{\partial T}\right)_{S}}{\left(\frac{\partial V}{\partial T}\right)_{S}} = \left(\frac{\partial P}{\partial T}\right)_{S}\left(\frac{\partial T}{\partial V}\right)_{S}=\left(\frac{\partial P}{\partial V}\right)_{S}\,$$

Taking together the two derivatives at constant T:

$$\frac{\left(\frac{\partial V}{\partial S}\right)_{T}}{\left(\frac{\partial P}{\partial S}\right)_{T}}=\left(\frac{\partial V}{\partial S}\right)_{T} \left(\frac{\partial S}{\partial P}\right)_{T}=\left(\frac{\partial V}{\partial P}\right)_{T}\,$$

From this one can write:

$$\frac{C_{P}}{C_{V}}=\left(\frac{\partial P}{\partial V}\right)_{S}\left(\frac{\partial V}{\partial P}\right)_{T}=\frac{\beta_{T}}{\beta_{S}}\,$$

== Ideal gas ==
This is a derivation to obtain an expression for $C_{P} - C_{V}\,$ for an ideal gas.

An ideal gas has the equation of state: $P V = n R T\,$

where

- P = pressure
- V = volume
- n = number of moles
- R = universal gas constant
- T = temperature

The ideal gas equation of state can be arranged to give:

$$V = n R T / P\,$$
or
$$\, n R = P V / T$$

The following partial derivatives are obtained from the above equation of state:

$$\left(\frac{\partial V}{\partial T}\right)_{P}\ = \frac {n R}{P}\ = \left(\frac{V P}{T}\right)\left(\frac{1}{P}\right) = \frac{V}{T}$$

$$\left(\frac{\partial V}{\partial P}\right)_{T}\ = - \frac {n R T}{P^2}\ = - \frac {P V}{P^2}\ = - \frac{V}{P}$$

The following simple expressions are obtained for thermal expansion coefficient $\alpha$:

$$\alpha=\frac{1}{V}\left(\frac{\partial V}{\partial T}\right)_{P}\ = \frac{1}{V}\left(\frac{V}{T}\right)$$

$$\alpha= 1 / T \,$$

and for isothermal compressibility $\beta_{T}$:

$$\beta_{T}= - \frac{1}{V}\left(\frac{\partial V}{\partial P}\right)_{T}\ =  - \frac{1}{V}\left( - \frac{V}{P}\right)$$

$$\beta_{T}= 1 / P \,$$

One can now calculate $C_{P} - C_{V}\,$ for ideal gases from the previously obtained general formula:

$$C_{P} - C_{V}= V T\frac{\alpha^{2}}{\beta_{T}}\ = V T\frac{(1 / T)^2}{1 / P} = \frac{V P}{T}$$

Substituting from the ideal gas equation gives finally:

$$C_{P} - C_{V} = n R\,$$

where n = number of moles of gas in the thermodynamic system under consideration and R = universal gas constant. On a per mole basis, the expression for difference in molar heat capacities becomes simply R for ideal gases as follows:

$$C_{P,m} - C_{V,m} = \frac{C_{P} - C_{V}}{n} = \frac{n R}{n} = R$$

This result would be consistent if the specific difference were derived directly from the general expression for $c_p - c_v\,$.

== Implications ==
A state of stable equilibrium implies the non-negativity of the heat capacities and the compressibilities. The non-negativity of the heat capacity is a requirement for thermal stability. For if the heat capacity were negative, a small fluctuation of heat added to a subsystem would result in a decrease of temperature relative to its surroundings, which would lead to even more heat added to the subsystem. Similarly, the non-negativity of the compressibility is a requirement for mechanical stability. For if the compressibility were negative, a small fluctuation of volume added to a subsystem would result in an increase of pressure relative to its surroundings, which would lead to even more volume added to the subsystem. Hence we have the inequality:
$$C_P \ge C_V \ge 0$$

A relation between $\beta_T$ and $\beta_S$ can be derived similarly as, or derived from, the relation between $C_P$ and $C_V$:
$$C_P (\beta_T - \beta_S) = VT \alpha^2$$

This implies:
$$\beta_T \ge \beta_S \ge 0$$

== See also ==
- Heat capacity ratio
