= Mayer's relation =

Thermodynamic relation about molar heat capacity

In the 19th century, German chemist and physicist Julius von Mayer derived a relation between the molar heat capacity at constant pressure and the molar heat capacity at constant volume for an ideal gas. Mayer's relation states that
$$C_{P,\mathrm{m}} - C_{V,\mathrm{m}} = R,$$
where C_{P,m} is the molar heat capacity at constant pressure, C_{V,m} is the molar heat capacity at constant volume and R is the gas constant.

== General form ==
For more general homogeneous substances, not just ideal gases, the difference takes the form,
$$C_{P,\mathrm{m}} - C_{V,\mathrm{m}} = V_{\mathrm{m}} T \frac{\alpha_V^2}{\beta_{T}}$$
(see relations between heat capacities), where $V_{\mathrm{m}}$ is the molar volume, $T$ is the temperature, $\alpha_{V}$ is the thermal expansion coefficient and $\beta$ is the isothermal compressibility.

From this latter relation, several inferences can be made:

- Since the isothermal compressibility $\beta_{T}$ is positive for nearly all phases, and the square of thermal expansion coefficient $\alpha$ is always either a positive quantity or zero, the specific heat at constant pressure is nearly always greater than or equal to specific heat at constant volume:
  $$C_{P,\mathrm{m}} \geq C_{V,\mathrm{m}}.$$
  There are no known exceptions to this principle for gases or liquids, but certain solids are known to exhibit negative compressibilities and presumably these would be (unusual) cases where $C_{P,\mathrm{m}} < C_{V,\mathrm{m}}$.
- For incompressible substances, C_{P,m} and C_{V,m} are identical. Also for substances that are nearly incompressible, such as solids and liquids, the difference between the two specific heats is negligible.
- As the absolute temperature of the system approaches zero, since both heat capacities must generally approach zero in accordance with the Third Law of Thermodynamics, the difference between C_{P,m} and C_{V,m} also approaches zero. Exceptions to this rule might be found in systems exhibiting residual entropy due to disorder within the crystal.
