= Material properties (thermodynamics) =

The thermodynamic properties of materials are intensive thermodynamic parameters which are specific to a given material. Each is directly related to a second order differential of a thermodynamic potential. Examples for a simple 1-component system are:

- Compressibility (or its inverse, the bulk modulus)

- Isothermal compressibility

$$\kappa_T=-\frac{1}{V}\left(\frac{\partial V}{\partial P}\right)_T
\quad = -\frac{1}{V}\,\frac{\partial^2 G}{\partial P^2}$$

- Adiabatic compressibility

$$\kappa_S=-\frac{1}{V}\left(\frac{\partial V}{\partial P}\right)_S
\quad = -\frac{1}{V}\,\frac{\partial^2 H}{\partial P^2}$$

- Specific heat (Note - the extensive analog is the heat capacity)

- Specific heat at constant pressure

$$c_P=\frac{T}{N}\left(\frac{\partial S}{\partial T}\right)_P
\quad = -\frac{T}{N}\,\frac{\partial^2 G}{\partial T^2}$$

- Specific heat at constant volume

$$c_V=\frac{T}{N}\left(\frac{\partial S}{\partial T}\right)_V
\quad = -\frac{T}{N}\,\frac{\partial^2 A}{\partial T^2}$$

- Coefficient of thermal expansion

$$\alpha=\frac{1}{V}\left(\frac{\partial V}{\partial T}\right)_P
\quad = \frac{1}{V}\,\frac{\partial^2 G}{\partial P\partial T}$$

where P is pressure, V is volume, T is temperature, S is entropy, and N is the number of particles.

For a single component system, only three second derivatives are needed in order to derive all others, and so only three material properties are needed to derive all others. For a single component system, the "standard" three parameters are the isothermal compressibility $\kappa_T$, the specific heat at constant pressure $c_P$, and the coefficient of thermal expansion $\alpha$.

For example, the following equations are true:

$$c_P=c_V+\frac{TV\alpha^2}{N\kappa_T}$$

$$\kappa_T=\kappa_S+\frac{TV\alpha^2}{Nc_P}$$

The three "standard" properties are in fact the three possible second derivatives of the Gibbs free energy with respect to temperature and pressure. Moreover, considering derivatives such as $\frac{\partial^3 G}{\partial P \partial T^2}$ and the related Schwartz relations, shows that the properties triplet is not independent. In fact, one property function can be given as an expression of the two others, up to a reference state value.

The second principle of thermodynamics has implications on the sign of some thermodynamic properties such isothermal compressibility.

== See also ==
- List of materials properties (thermal properties)
- Heat capacity ratio
- Statistical mechanics
- Thermodynamic equations
- Thermodynamic databases for pure substances
- Heat transfer coefficient
- Latent heat
- Specific heat of melting (Enthalpy of fusion)
- Specific heat of vaporization (Enthalpy of vaporization)
- Thermal mass
