= Quantum statistical mechanics =

Statistical mechanics of quantum-mechanical systems

Quantum statistical mechanics is statistical mechanics applied to quantum mechanical systems. It relies on constructing density matrices that describe quantum systems in thermal equilibrium. Its applications include the study of collections of identical particles, which provides a theory that explains phenomena including superconductivity and superfluidity.

== Density matrices, expectation values, and entropy ==
In quantum mechanics, probabilities for the outcomes of experiments made upon a system are calculated from the quantum state describing that system. Each physical system is associated with a vector space, or more specifically a Hilbert space. The dimension of the Hilbert space may be infinite, as it is for the space of square-integrable functions on a line, which is used to define the quantum physics of a continuous degree of freedom. Alternatively, the Hilbert space may be finite-dimensional, as occurs for spin degrees of freedom. A density operator, the mathematical representation of a quantum state, is a positive semi-definite, self-adjoint operator of trace one acting on the Hilbert space of the system. A density operator that is a rank-1 projection is known as a pure quantum state, and all quantum states that are not pure are designated mixed. Pure states are also known as wavefunctions. Assigning a pure state to a quantum system implies certainty about the outcome of some measurement on that system. The state space of a quantum system is the set of all states, pure and mixed, that can be assigned to it. For any system, the state space is a convex set: Any mixed state can be written as a convex combination of pure states, though not in a unique way.

The prototypical example of a finite-dimensional Hilbert space is a qubit, a quantum system whose Hilbert space is 2-dimensional. An arbitrary state for a qubit can be written as a linear combination of the Pauli matrices, which provide a basis for $2 \times 2$ self-adjoint matrices:
$$\rho = \tfrac{1}{2}\left(I + r_x \sigma_x + r_y \sigma_y + r_z \sigma_z\right),$$
where the real numbers $(r_x, r_y, r_z)$ are the coordinates of a point within the unit ball and
$$\sigma_x =
\begin{pmatrix}
0&1\\
1&0
\end{pmatrix}, \quad
\sigma_y =
\begin{pmatrix}
0&-i\\
i&0
\end{pmatrix}, \quad
\sigma_z =
\begin{pmatrix}
1&0\\
0&-1
\end{pmatrix} .$$

In classical probability and statistics, the expected (or expectation) value of a random variable is the mean of the possible values that random variable can take, weighted by the respective probabilities of those outcomes. The corresponding concept in quantum physics is the expectation value of an observable. Physically measurable quantities are represented mathematically by self-adjoint operators that act on the Hilbert space associated with a quantum system. The expectation value of an observable is the Hilbert–Schmidt inner product of the operator representing that observable and the density operator:
$$\langle A \rangle = \operatorname{tr}(A \rho).$$

The von Neumann entropy, named after John von Neumann, quantifies the extent to which a state is mixed. It extends the concept of Gibbs entropy from classical statistical mechanics to quantum statistical mechanics, and it is the quantum counterpart of the Shannon entropy from classical information theory. For a quantum-mechanical system described by a density matrix ρ, the von Neumann entropy is
$$S = - \operatorname{tr}(\rho \ln \rho),$$
where $\operatorname{tr}$ denotes the trace and $\operatorname{ln}$ denotes the matrix version of the natural logarithm. If the density matrix ρ is written in a basis of its eigenvectors $|1\rangle, |2\rangle, |3\rangle, \dots$ as
$$\rho = \sum_j \eta_j \left| j \right\rang \left\lang j \right| ,$$
then the von Neumann entropy is merely
$$S = -\sum_j \eta_j \ln \eta_j .$$
In this form, S can be seen as the Shannon entropy of the eigenvalues, reinterpreted as probabilities.

The von Neumann entropy vanishes when $\rho$ is a pure state. In the Bloch sphere picture, this occurs when the point $(r_x, r_y, r_z)$ lies on the surface of the unit ball. The von Neumann entropy attains its maximum value when $\rho$ is the maximally mixed state, which for the case of a qubit is given by $r_x = r_y = r_z = 0$.

The von Neumann entropy and quantities based upon it are widely used in the study of quantum entanglement.

== Thermodynamic ensembles ==
=== Canonical ===
Consider an ensemble of systems described by a Hamiltonian H with average energy E. If H has pure-point spectrum and the eigenvalues $E_n$ of H go to +∞ sufficiently fast, e^{−r H} will be a non-negative trace-class operator for every positive r.

The canonical ensemble (or sometimes Gibbs canonical ensemble) is described by the state
$$\rho = \frac{\mathrm{e}^{- \beta H}}{\operatorname{Tr}(\mathrm{e}^{- \beta H})},$$
where β is such that the ensemble average of energy satisfies
$$\operatorname{Tr}(\rho H) = E$$
and
$$\operatorname{Tr}(\mathrm{e}^{- \beta H}) = \sum_n \mathrm{e}^{- \beta E_n} = Z(\beta).$$

This is called the partition function; it is the quantum mechanical version of the canonical partition function of classical statistical mechanics. The probability that a system chosen at random from the ensemble will be in a state corresponding to energy eigenvalue $E_m$ is

$$\mathcal{P}(E_m) = \frac{\mathrm{e}^{- \beta E_m}}{\sum_n \mathrm{e}^{- \beta E_n}}.$$

The Gibbs canonical ensemble maximizes the von Neumann entropy of the state subject to the condition that the average energy is fixed.

=== Grand canonical ===
For open systems where the energy and numbers of particles may fluctuate, the system is described by the grand canonical ensemble, described by the density matrix
$$\rho = \frac{\mathrm{e}^{\beta (\sum_i \mu_iN_i - H)}}{\operatorname{Tr}\left(\mathrm{e}^{ \beta ( \sum_i \mu_iN_i - H)}\right)}.$$
Here, the N_{1}, N_{2}, ... are the particle number operators for the different species of particles that are exchanged with the reservoir. Unlike the canonical ensemble, this density matrix involves a sum over states with different N.

The grand partition function is
$$\mathcal Z(\beta, \mu_1, \mu_2, \cdots) = \operatorname{Tr}(\mathrm{e}^{\beta (\sum_i \mu_iN_i - H)})$$

Density matrices of this form maximize the entropy subject to the constraints that both the average energy and the average particle number are fixed.

== Identical particles and quantum statistics ==
In quantum mechanics, indistinguishable particles (also called identical or indiscernible particles) are particles that cannot be distinguished from one another, even in principle. Species of identical particles include, but are not limited to, elementary particles (such as electrons), composite subatomic particles (such as atomic nuclei), as well as atoms and molecules. Although all known indistinguishable particles only exist at the quantum scale, there is no exhaustive list of all possible sorts of particles nor a clear-cut limit of applicability, as explored in quantum statistics. They were first discussed by Werner Heisenberg and Paul Dirac in 1926.

There are two main categories of identical particles: bosons, which are described by quantum states that are symmetric under exchanges, and fermions, which are described by antisymmetric states. Examples of bosons are photons, gluons, phonons, helium-4 nuclei and all mesons. Examples of fermions are electrons, neutrinos, quarks, protons, neutrons, and helium-3 nuclei.

The fact that particles can be identical has important consequences in statistical mechanics, and identical particles exhibit markedly different statistical behavior from distinguishable particles. The theory of boson quantum statistics is the starting point for understanding superfluids, and quantum statistics are also necessary to explain the related phenomenon of superconductivity.

== See also ==
- Quantum thermodynamics
- Thermal quantum field theory
- Stochastic thermodynamics
- Abstract Wiener space
