= Volume (thermodynamics) =

Extensive parameter used to describe a thermodynamic system's state

- Common symbols: V
- SI unit: m^{3}

In thermodynamics, the volume of a system is an important extensive parameter for describing its thermodynamic state. The specific volume, an intensive property, is the system's volume per unit mass. Volume is a function of state and is interdependent with other thermodynamic properties such as pressure and temperature. For example, volume is related to the pressure and temperature of an ideal gas by the ideal gas law. The physical region covered by a system may or may not coincide with a control volume used to analyze the system.

== Overview ==
The volume of a thermodynamic system typically refers to the volume of the working fluid, such as, for example, the fluid within a piston. Changes to this volume may be made through an application of work, or may be used to produce work. An isochoric process however operates at a constant-volume, thus no work can be produced. Many other thermodynamic processes will result in a change in volume. A polytropic process, in particular, causes changes to the system so that the quantity $pV^n$ is constant (where $p$ is pressure, $V$ is volume, and $n$ is the polytropic index, a constant). Note that for specific polytropic indexes, a polytropic process will be equivalent to a constant-property process. For instance, for very large values of $n$ approaching infinity, the process becomes constant-volume.

Gases are compressible, thus their volumes (and specific volumes) may be subject to change during thermodynamic processes. Liquids, however, are nearly incompressible, thus their volumes can be often taken as constant. In general, compressibility is defined as the relative volume change of a fluid or solid as a response to a pressure, and may be determined for substances in any phase. Similarly, thermal expansion is the tendency of matter to change in volume in response to a change in temperature.

Many thermodynamic cycles are made up of varying processes, some which maintain a constant volume and some which do not. A vapor-compression refrigeration cycle, for example, follows a sequence where the refrigerant fluid transitions between the liquid and vapor states of matter.

Typical units for volume are $\mathrm{m^3}$ (cubic meters), $\mathrm{l}$ (liters), and $\mathrm{ft}^3$ (cubic feet).

== Heat and work ==
Pressure	Volume
(Stress)	(Strain)
Temperature	Entropy
Chemical potential	Particle number

Mechanical work performed on a working fluid causes a change in the mechanical constraints of the system; in other words, for work to occur, the volume must be altered. Hence, volume is an important parameter in characterizing many thermodynamic processes where an exchange of energy in the form of work is involved.

Volume is one of a pair of conjugate variables, the other being pressure. As with all conjugate pairs, the product is a form of energy. The product $pV$ is the energy lost to a system due to mechanical work. This product is one term which makes up enthalpy $H$:

$$H = U + pV,\,$$

where $U$ is the internal energy of the system.

The second law of thermodynamics describes constraints on the amount of useful work which can be extracted from a thermodynamic system. In thermodynamic systems where the temperature and volume are held constant, the measure of "useful" work attainable is the Helmholtz free energy; and in systems where the volume is not held constant, the measure of useful work attainable is the Gibbs free energy.

Similarly, the appropriate value of heat capacity to use in a given process depends on whether the process produces a change in volume. The heat capacity is a function of the amount of heat added to a system. In the case of a constant-volume process, all the heat affects the internal energy of the system (i.e., there is no pV-work, and all the heat affects the temperature). However, in a process without a constant volume, the heat addition affects both the internal energy and the work (i.e., the enthalpy); thus the temperature changes by a different amount than in the constant-volume case and a different heat capacity value is required.

== Specific volume ==
Specific volume ($\nu$) is the volume occupied by a unit of mass of a material. In many cases, the specific volume is a useful quantity to determine because, as an intensive property, it can be used to determine the complete state of a system in conjunction with another independent intensive variable. The specific volume also allows systems to be studied without reference to an exact operating volume, which may not be known (nor significant) at some stages of analysis.

The specific volume of a substance is equal to the reciprocal of its mass density. Specific volume may be expressed in $\frac{\mathrm{m^3}}{\mathrm{kg}}$, $\frac{\mathrm{ft^3}}{\mathrm{lb}}$, $\frac{\mathrm{ft^3}}{\mathrm{slug}}$, or $\frac{\mathrm{mL}}{\mathrm{g}}$ .

$$\nu = \frac{V}{m} = \frac{1}{\rho}$$

where, $V$ is the volume, $m$ is the mass and $\rho$ is the density of the material.

For an ideal gas,

$$\nu = \frac{{\bar{R}}  T}{P}$$

where, ${\bar{R}}$ is the specific gas constant, $T$ is the temperature and $P$ is the pressure of the gas.

Specific volume may also refer to molar volume.

== Gas volume ==
=== Dependence on pressure and temperature ===
The volume of gas increases proportionally to absolute temperature and decreases inversely proportionally to pressure, approximately according to the ideal gas law:
$$V = \frac{nRT}{p}$$
where:

- p is the pressure
- V is the volume
- n is the amount of substance of gas (moles)
- R is the gas constant, 8.314 J·K^{−1}mol^{−1}
- T is the absolute temperature

To simplify, a volume of gas may be expressed as the volume it would have in standard conditions for temperature and pressure, which are 0 °C (32 °F) and 100 kPa.

=== Humidity exclusion ===
In contrast to other gas components, water content in air, or humidity, to a higher degree depends on vaporization and condensation from or into water, which, in turn, mainly depends on temperature. Therefore, when applying more pressure to a gas saturated with water, all components will initially decrease in volume approximately according to the ideal gas law. However, some of the water will condense until returning to almost the same humidity as before, giving the resulting total volume deviating from what the ideal gas law predicted. Conversely, decreasing temperature would also make some water condense, again making the final volume deviating from predicted by the ideal gas law.

Therefore, gas volume may alternatively be expressed excluding the humidity content: V_{d} (volume dry). This fraction more accurately follows the ideal gas law. On the contrary, V_{s} (volume saturated) is the volume a gas mixture would have if humidity was added to it until saturation (or 100% relative humidity).

=== General conversion ===
To compare gas volume between two conditions of different temperature or pressure (1 and 2), assuming nR are the same, the following equation uses humidity exclusion in addition to the ideal gas law:

$$V_2 = V_1 \times \frac{T_2}{T_1} \times \frac{p_1-p_{w,1}}{p_2-p_{w,2}}$$

Where, in addition to terms used in the ideal gas law:

- p_{w} is the partial pressure of gaseous water during condition 1 and 2, respectively

For example, calculating how much 1 liter of air (a) at 0 °C, 100 kPa, p_{w} = 0 kPa (known as STPD, see below) would fill when breathed into the lungs where it is mixed with water vapor (l), where it quickly becomes 37 °C (99 °F), 100 kPa, p_{w} = 6.2 kPa (BTPS):

$$V_{l} = 1\ \mathrm{l} \times \frac{310\ \mathrm{K}}{273\ \mathrm{K}} \times \frac{100\ \mathrm{kPa}-0\ \mathrm{kPa}}{100\ \mathrm{kPa}-6.2\ \mathrm{kPa}} = 1.21\ \mathrm{l}$$

=== Common conditions ===
Some common expressions of gas volume with defined or variable temperature, pressure and humidity inclusion are:

- ATPS: Ambient temperature (variable) and pressure (variable), saturated (humidity depends on temperature)
- ATPD: Ambient temperature (variable) and pressure (variable), dry (no humidity)
- BTPS: Body temperature (37 °C or 310 K) and pressure (generally same as ambient), saturated (47 mmHg or 6.2 kPa)
- STPD: Standard temperature (0 °C or 273 K) and pressure (760 mmHg (101.33 kPa) or 100 kPa (750.06 mmHg)), dry (no humidity)

=== Conversion factors ===
The following conversion factors can be used to convert between expressions for volume of a gas:

To convert from	To	Multiply by
ATPS	STPD	[(P_{A} – P_{water S}) / P_{S}] * [T_{S} / T_{A}]
ATPS	BTPS	[(P_{A} – P_{water S}) / (P_{A} – P_{water B})] * [T_{B}/T_{A}]
ATPS	ATPD	(P_{A} – P_{water S}) / P_{A}
ATPD	STPD	(P_{A} / P_{S}) * (T_{S} / T_{A})
ATPD	BTPS	[P_{A} / (P_{A} – P_{water B})] * (T_{B} / T_{A})
ATPD	ATPS	P_{A} / (P_{A} – P_{water S})
BTPS	STPD	[(P_{A} – P_{water B}) / P_{S}] * [T_{S} / T_{B}]
BTPS	ATPS	[(P_{A} – P_{water B}) / (P_{A} – P_{water S})] * [T_{A} / T_{B}]
BTPS	ATPD	[(P_{A} – P_{water B}) / P_{A}] * [T_{A} / T_{B}]
STPD	BTPS	[P_{S} / (P_{A} - P_{water B})] * [T_{B} / T_{S}]
STPD	ATPS	[P_{S} / (P_{A} - P_{water S})] * [T_{A} / T_{S}]
STPD	ATPD	[P_{S} / P_{A}] * [T_{A} / T_{S}]
Legend: P_{A} = Ambient pressure; P_{S} = Standard pressure (100 kPa or 750 mmHg); P_{water S} = Partial pressure of water in saturated air (that is, at 100% relative humidity; in this case the partial pressure is equal to the vapour pressure, which can be determined as a function of ambient temperature); P_{water B} = Partial pressure of water in saturated air in 37 °C = 47 mmHg; T_{S} = Standard temperature in kelvins (K) = 273 K; T_{A} = Ambient temperature in kelvins = 273 + t (where t is ambient temperature in °C); T_{B} = Body temperature in kelvins = 310 K

=== Partial volume ===
The partial volume of a particular gas is a fraction of the total volume occupied by the gas mixture, with unchanged pressure and temperature. In gas mixtures, e.g. air, the partial volume allows focusing on one particular gas component, e.g. oxygen.

It can be approximated both from partial pressure and molar fraction:
$$V_{\rm X} = V_{\rm tot} \times \frac{P_{\rm X}}{P_{\rm tot}} = V_{\rm tot} \times \frac{n_{\rm X}}{n_{\rm tot}}$$

- V_{X} is the partial volume of any individual gas component (X)
- V_{tot} is the total volume in gas mixture
- P_{X} is the partial pressure of gas X
- P_{tot} is the total pressure in gas mixture
- n_{X} is the amount of substance of a gas (X)
- n_{tot} is the total amount of substance in gas mixture

== See also ==
- Volumetric flow rate
