= First law of thermodynamics =

Law of thermodynamics establishing the conservation of energy

The first law of thermodynamics is a formulation of the law of conservation of energy in the context of thermodynamic processes. For a thermodynamic process affecting a thermodynamic system without transfer of matter, the law distinguishes two principal forms of energy transfer, heat and thermodynamic work. The law also defines the internal energy of a system, an extensive property for taking account of the balance of heat transfer, thermodynamic work, and matter transfer, into and out of the system. Energy cannot be created or destroyed, but it can be transformed from one form to another. In an externally isolated system, with internal changes, the sum of all forms of energy is constant.

An equivalent statement is that perpetual motion machines of the first kind are impossible; work done by a system on its surroundings requires that the system's internal energy be consumed, so that the amount of internal energy lost by that work must be resupplied as heat by an external energy source or as work by an external machine acting on the system to sustain the work of the system continuously.

== Definition ==
For thermodynamic processes of energy transfer without transfer of matter, the first law of thermodynamics is often expressed by the algebraic sum of contributions to the internal energy, $U,$ from all work, $W,$ done on or by the system, and the quantity of heat, $Q,$ supplied to the system. With the sign convention of Rudolf Clausius, that heat supplied to the system is positive, but work done by the system is subtracted, a change in the internal energy, $\Delta U,$ is written

$$\Delta U = Q - W.$$

Modern formulations, such as by Max Planck, and by IUPAC, often replace the subtraction with addition, and consider all net energy transfers to the system as positive and all net energy transfers from the system as negative, irrespective of the use of the system, for example as an engine.

When a system expands in an isobaric process, the thermodynamic work, $W,$ done by the system on the surroundings is the product, $P~ \Delta V,$ of system pressure, $P,$ and system volume change, $\Delta V,$ whereas $- P~ \Delta V$ is said to be the thermodynamic work done on the system by the surroundings. The change in internal energy of the system is:

$$\Delta U = Q - P~ \Delta V,$$

where $Q$ denotes the quantity of heat supplied to the system from its surroundings.

Work and heat express physical processes of supply or removal of energy, while the internal energy $U$ is a mathematical abstraction that keeps account of the changes of energy that befall the system. The term $Q$ is the quantity of energy added or removed as heat in the thermodynamic sense, not referring to a form of energy within the system. Likewise, $W$ denotes the quantity of energy gained or lost through thermodynamic work. Internal energy is a property of the system, while work and heat describe the process, not the system. Thus, a given internal energy change, $\Delta U,$ can be achieved by different combinations of heat and work. Heat and work are said to be path dependent, while change in internal energy depends only on the initial and final states of the system, not on the path between. Thermodynamic work is measured by change in the system, and, because of friction, is not necessarily the same as work measured by forces and distances in the surroundings, though, ideally, such can sometimes be arranged; this distinction is noted in the term 'isochoric work', at constant system volume, with $\Delta V = 0,$ which is not a form of thermodynamic work.

For thermodynamic processes of energy transfer with transfer of matter, the extensive character of internal energy can be stated: for the otherwise isolated combination of two thermodynamic systems with internal energies $U_1$ and $U_2$ into a single system with internal energy $U_0,$

$$U_0=U_1+U_2.$$

== History ==
In the first half of the eighteenth century, French philosopher and mathematician Émilie du Châtelet made notable contributions to the emerging theoretical framework of energy, for example by emphasising Gottfried Wilhelm Leibniz's concept of vis viva, mv^{2} (mass times speed squared), as distinct from Isaac Newton's momentum, mv.

Empirical developments of the early ideas, in the century following, wrestled with contravening concepts such as the caloric theory of heat.

In the few years of his life (1796–1832) after the 1824 publication of his book Reflections on the Motive Power of Fire, Sadi Carnot came to understand that the caloric theory of heat was restricted to mere calorimetry, and that heat and "motive power" are interconvertible. This is known only from his posthumously published notes. He wrote:

Heat is simply motive power, or rather motion which has changed its form. It is a movement among the particles of bodies. Whereever there is destruction of motive power, there is at the same time production of heat in quantity exactly proportional to the quantity of motive power destroyed. Reciprocally, wherever there is destruction of heat, there is production of motive power.

At that time, the concept of mechanical work had not been formulated. Carnot was aware that heat could be produced by friction and by percussion, as forms of dissipation of "motive power". As late as 1847, Lord Kelvin believed in the caloric theory of heat, being unaware of Carnot's notes.

In 1840, Germain Hess stated a conservation law (Hess's law) for the heat of reaction during chemical transformations. This law was later recognized as a consequence of the first law of thermodynamics, but Hess's statement was not explicitly concerned with the relation between energy exchanges by heat and work.

In 1842, Julius Robert von Mayer made a statement that was rendered by Clifford Truesdell (1980) as "in a process at constant pressure, the heat used to produce expansion is universally interconvertible with work", but this is not a general statement of the first law, for it does not express the concept of the thermodynamic state variable, the internal energy. Also in 1842, Mayer measured a temperature rise caused by friction in a body of paper pulp. This was near the time of the 1842–1845 work of James Prescott Joule, measuring the mechanical equivalent of heat. In 1845, Joule published a paper entitled The Mechanical Equivalent of Heat, in which he specified a numerical value for the amount of mechanical work required to "produce a unit of heat", based on heat production by friction in the passage of electricity through a resistor and in the rotation of a paddle in a vat of water.

The first full statements of the law came in 1850 from Rudolf Clausius, and from William Rankine. Some scholars consider Rankine's statement less distinct than that of Clausius.

=== Original statements: the "thermodynamic approach" ===
The original 19th-century statements of the first law appeared in a conceptual framework in which transfer of energy as heat was taken as a primitive notion, defined by calorimetry. It was presupposed as logically prior to the theoretical development of thermodynamics. Jointly primitive with this notion of heat were the notions of empirical temperature and thermal equilibrium. This framework also took as primitive the notion of transfer of energy as work. This framework did not presume a concept of energy in general, but regarded it as derived or synthesized from the prior notions of heat and work. By one author, this framework has been called the "thermodynamic" approach.

The first explicit statement of the first law of thermodynamics, by Rudolf Clausius in 1850, referred to cyclic thermodynamic processes, and to the existence of a function of state of the system, the internal energy. He expressed it in terms of a differential equation for the increments of a thermodynamic process. This equation may be described as follows:

In a thermodynamic process involving a closed system (no transfer of matter), the increment in the internal energy is equal to the difference between the heat accumulated by the system and the thermodynamic work done by it.

Reflecting the experimental work of Mayer and of Joule, Clausius wrote:

In all cases in which work is produced by the agency of heat, a quantity of heat is consumed which is proportional to the work done; and conversely, by the expenditure of an equal quantity of work an equal quantity of heat is produced.

Because of its definition in terms of increments, the value of the internal energy of a system is not uniquely defined. It is defined only up to an arbitrary additive constant of integration, which can be adjusted to give arbitrary reference zero levels. This non-uniqueness is in keeping with the abstract mathematical nature of the internal energy. The internal energy is customarily stated relative to a conventionally chosen standard reference state of the system.

The concept of internal energy is considered by Bailyn to be of "enormous interest". Its quantity cannot be immediately measured, but can only be inferred, by differencing actual immediate measurements. Bailyn likens it to the energy states of an atom, that were revealed by Bohr's energy relation hν = E_{n″} − E_{n′}. In each case, an unmeasurable quantity (the internal energy, the atomic energy level) is revealed by considering the difference of measured quantities (increments of internal energy, quantities of emitted or absorbed radiative energy).

=== Conceptual revision: the "mechanical approach" ===
In 1907, George H. Bryan wrote about systems between which there is no transfer of matter (closed systems): "Definition. When energy flows from one system or part of a system to another otherwise than by the performance of mechanical work, the energy so transferred is called heat." This definition may be regarded as expressing a conceptual revision, as follows. This reinterpretation was systematically expounded in 1909 by Constantin Carathéodory, whose attention had been drawn to it by Max Born. Largely through Born's influence, this revised conceptual approach to the definition of heat came to be preferred by many twentieth-century writers. It might be called the "mechanical approach".

Energy can also be transferred from one thermodynamic system to another in association with transfer of matter. Born points out that in general such energy transfer is not resolvable uniquely into work and heat moieties. In general, when there is transfer of energy associated with matter transfer, work and heat transfers can be distinguished only when they pass through walls physically separate from those for matter transfer.

The "mechanical" approach postulates the law of conservation of energy. It also postulates that energy can be transferred from one thermodynamic system to another adiabatically as work, and that energy can be held as the internal energy of a thermodynamic system. It also postulates that energy can be transferred from one thermodynamic system to another by a path that is non-adiabatic, and is unaccompanied by matter transfer. Initially, it "cleverly" (according to Martin Bailyn) refrains from labelling as 'heat' such non-adiabatic, unaccompanied transfer of energy. It rests on the primitive notion of walls, especially adiabatic walls and non-adiabatic walls, defined as follows. Temporarily, only for purpose of this definition, one can prohibit transfer of energy as work across a wall of interest. Then walls of interest fall into two classes, (a) those such that arbitrary systems separated by them remain independently in their own previously established respective states of internal thermodynamic equilibrium; they are defined as adiabatic; and (b) those without such independence; they are defined as non-adiabatic.

This approach derives the notions of transfer of energy as heat, and of temperature, as theoretical developments, not taking them as primitives. It regards calorimetry as a derived theory. It has an early origin in the nineteenth century, for example in the work of Hermann von Helmholtz, but also in the work of many others.

== Conceptually revised statement, according to the mechanical approach ==
The revised statement of the first law postulates that a change in the internal energy of a system due to any arbitrary process, that takes the system from a given initial thermodynamic state to a given final equilibrium thermodynamic state, can be determined through the physical existence, for those given states, of a reference process that occurs purely through stages of adiabatic work.

The revised statement is then

For a closed system, in any arbitrary process of interest that takes it from an initial to a final state of internal thermodynamic equilibrium, the change of internal energy is the same as that for a reference adiabatic work process that links those two states. This is so regardless of the path of the process of interest, and regardless of whether it is an adiabatic or a non-adiabatic process. The reference adiabatic work process may be chosen arbitrarily from amongst the class of all such processes.

This statement is much less close to the empirical basis than are the original statements, but is often regarded as conceptually parsimonious in that it rests only on the concepts of adiabatic work and of non-adiabatic processes, not on the concepts of transfer of energy as heat and of empirical temperature that are presupposed by the original statements. Largely through the influence of Max Born, it is often regarded as theoretically preferable because of this conceptual parsimony. Born particularly observes that the revised approach avoids thinking in terms of what he calls the "imported engineering" concept of heat engines.

Basing his thinking on the mechanical approach, Born in 1921, and again in 1949, proposed to revise the definition of heat. In particular, he referred to the work of Constantin Carathéodory, who had in 1909 stated the first law without defining quantity of heat. Born's definition was specifically for transfers of energy without transfer of matter, and it has been widely followed in textbooks (examples:). Born observes that a transfer of matter between two systems is accompanied by a transfer of internal energy that cannot be resolved into heat and work components. There can be pathways to other systems, spatially separate from that of the matter transfer, that allow heat and work transfer independent of and simultaneous with the matter transfer. Energy is conserved in such transfers.

== Description ==
=== Cyclic processes ===
The first law of thermodynamics for a closed system was expressed in two ways by Clausius. One way referred to cyclic processes and the inputs and outputs of the system, but did not refer to increments in the internal state of the system. The other way referred to an incremental change in the internal state of the system, and did not expect the process to be cyclic.

A cyclic process is one that can be repeated indefinitely often, returning the system to its initial state. Of particular interest for single cycle of a cyclic process are the net work done, and the net heat taken in (or 'consumed', in Clausius' statement), by the system.

In a cyclic process in which the system does net work on its surroundings, it is observed to be physically necessary not only that heat be taken into the system, but also, importantly, that some heat leave the system. The difference is the heat converted by the cycle into work. In each repetition of a cyclic process, the net work done by the system, measured in mechanical units, is proportional to the heat consumed, measured in calorimetric units.

The constant of proportionality is universal and independent of the system and in 1845 and 1847 was measured by James Joule, who described it as the mechanical equivalent of heat.

== Various statements of the law for closed systems ==
The law is of great importance and generality and is consequently thought of from several points of view. Most careful textbook statements of the law express it for closed systems. It is stated in several ways, sometimes even by the same author.

For the thermodynamics of closed systems, the distinction between transfers of energy as work and as heat is central and is within the scope of the present article. For the thermodynamics of open systems, such a distinction is beyond the scope of the present article, but some limited comments are made on it in the section below headed 'First law of thermodynamics for open systems'.

There are two main ways of stating a law of thermodynamics, physically or mathematically. They should be logically coherent and consistent with one another.

An example of a physical statement is that of Planck (1897/1903):

It is in no way possible, either by mechanical, thermal, chemical, or other devices, to obtain perpetual motion, i.e. it is impossible to construct an engine which will work in a cycle and produce continuous work, or kinetic energy, from nothing.

This physical statement is restricted neither to closed systems nor to systems with states that are strictly defined only for thermodynamic equilibrium; it has meaning also for open systems and for systems with states that are not in thermodynamic equilibrium.

An example of a mathematical statement is that of Crawford (1963):

For a given system we let ΔE^{kin} be the change in its macroscopic kinetic energy, ΔE^{pot}, the change in its macroscopic potential energy, and ΔE^{tot}, the change in its total energy. The first two quantities are specifiable in terms of appropriate mechanical variables, and by definition

$$E^{\mathrm{tot}}=E^{\mathrm{kin}}+E^{\mathrm{pot}}+U\,\,.$$

For any finite process, whether reversible or irreversible,

$$\Delta E^{\mathrm{tot}}=\Delta E^{\mathrm{kin}}+\Delta E^{\mathrm{pot}}+\Delta U\,\,.$$

The first law in a form that involves the principle of conservation of energy more generally is

$$\Delta E^{\mathrm{tot}}=Q+W\,\,.$$

Here Q and W are heat and work added, with no restrictions as to whether the process is reversible, quasistatic, or irreversible.

This statement by Crawford, for W, uses the sign convention of IUPAC, not that of Clausius. Though it does not explicitly say so, this statement refers to closed systems. Internal energy U is evaluated for bodies in states of thermodynamic equilibrium, which possess well-defined temperatures, relative to a reference state.

The history of statements of the law for closed systems has two main periods, before and after the work of George H. Bryan (1907), of Carathéodory (1909), and the approval of Carathéodory's work given by Born (1921). The earlier traditional versions of the law for closed systems are nowadays often considered to be out of date.

Carathéodory's celebrated presentation of equilibrium thermodynamics refers to closed systems, which are allowed to contain several phases connected by internal walls of various kinds of impermeability and permeability (explicitly including walls that are permeable only to heat). Carathéodory's 1909 version of the first law of thermodynamics was stated in an axiom which refrained from defining or mentioning temperature or quantity of heat transferred. That axiom stated that the internal energy of a phase in equilibrium is a function of state, that the sum of the internal energies of the phases is the total internal energy of the system, and that the value of the total internal energy of the system is changed by the amount of work done adiabatically on it, considering work as a form of energy. That article considered this statement to be an expression of the law of conservation of energy for such systems. This version is nowadays widely accepted as authoritative, but is stated in slightly varied ways by different authors.

Such statements of the first law for closed systems assert the existence of internal energy as a function of state defined in terms of adiabatic work. Thus heat is not defined calorimetrically or as due to temperature difference. It is defined as a residual difference between change of internal energy and work done on the system, when that work does not account for the whole of the change of internal energy and the system is not adiabatically isolated.

The 1909 Carathéodory statement of the law in axiomatic form does not mention heat or temperature, but the equilibrium states to which it refers are explicitly defined by variable sets that necessarily include "non-deformation variables", such as pressures, which, within reasonable restrictions, can be rightly interpreted as empirical temperatures, and the walls connecting the phases of the system are explicitly defined as possibly impermeable to heat or permeable only to heat.

According to A. Münster (1970), "A somewhat unsatisfactory aspect of Carathéodory's theory is that a consequence of the Second Law must be considered at this point [in the statement of the first law], i.e. that it is not always possible to reach any state 2 from any other state 1 by means of an adiabatic process." Münster instances that no adiabatic process can reduce the internal energy of a system at constant volume. Carathéodory's paper asserts that its statement of the first law corresponds exactly to Joule's experimental arrangement, regarded as an instance of adiabatic work. It does not point out that Joule's experimental arrangement performed essentially irreversible work, through friction of paddles in a liquid, or passage of electric current through a resistance inside the system, driven by motion of a coil and inductive heating, or by an external current source, which can access the system only by the passage of electrons, and so is not strictly adiabatic, because electrons are a form of matter, which cannot penetrate adiabatic walls. The paper goes on to base its main argument on the possibility of quasi-static adiabatic work, which is essentially reversible. The paper asserts that it will avoid reference to Carnot cycles, and then proceeds to base its argument on cycles of forward and backward quasi-static adiabatic stages, with isothermal stages of zero magnitude.

Sometimes the concept of internal energy is not made explicit in the statement.

Sometimes the existence of the internal energy is made explicit but work is not explicitly mentioned in the statement of the first postulate of thermodynamics. Heat supplied is then defined as the residual change in internal energy after work has been taken into account, in a non-adiabatic process.

A respected modern author states the first law of thermodynamics as "Heat is a form of energy", which explicitly mentions neither internal energy nor adiabatic work. Heat is defined as energy transferred by thermal contact with a reservoir, which has a temperature, and is generally so large that addition and removal of heat do not alter its temperature. A current student text on chemistry defines heat thus: "heat is the exchange of thermal energy between a system and its surroundings caused by a temperature difference." The author then explains how heat is defined or measured by calorimetry, in terms of heat capacity, specific heat capacity, molar heat capacity, and temperature.

A respected text disregards the Carathéodory's exclusion of mention of heat from the statement of the first law for closed systems, and admits heat calorimetrically defined along with work and internal energy. Another respected text defines heat exchange as determined by temperature difference, but also mentions that the Born (1921) version is "completely rigorous". These versions follow the traditional approach that is now considered out of date, exemplified by that of Planck (1897/1903).

== Evidence for the first law of thermodynamics for closed systems ==
The first law of thermodynamics for closed systems was originally induced from empirically observed evidence, including calorimetric evidence. It is nowadays, however, taken to provide the definition of heat via the law of conservation of energy and the definition of work in terms of changes in the external parameters of a system. The original discovery of the law was gradual over a period of perhaps half a century or more, and some early studies were in terms of cyclic processes.

The following is an account in terms of changes of state of a closed system through compound processes that are not necessarily cyclic. This account first considers processes for which the first law is easily verified because of their simplicity, namely adiabatic processes (in which there is no transfer as heat) and adynamic processes (in which there is no transfer as work).

=== Adiabatic processes ===
In an adiabatic process, there is transfer of energy as work but not as heat. For all adiabatic process that takes a system from a given initial state to a given final state, irrespective of how the work is done, the respective eventual total quantities of energy transferred as work are one and the same, determined just by the given initial and final states. The work done on the system is defined and measured by changes in mechanical or quasi-mechanical variables external to the system. Physically, adiabatic transfer of energy as work requires the existence of adiabatic enclosures.

For instance, in Joule's experiment, the initial system is a tank of water with a paddle wheel inside. If we isolate the tank thermally, and move the paddle wheel with a pulley and a weight, we can relate the increase in temperature with the distance descended by the mass. Next, the system is returned to its initial state, isolated again, and the same amount of work is done on the tank using different devices (an electric motor, a chemical battery, a spring,...). In every case, the amount of work can be measured independently. The return to the initial state is not conducted by doing adiabatic work on the system. The evidence shows that the final state of the water (in particular, its temperature and volume) is the same in every case. It is irrelevant if the work is electrical, mechanical, chemical,... or if done suddenly or slowly, as long as it is performed in an adiabatic way, that is to say, without heat transfer into or out of the system.

Evidence of this kind shows that to increase the temperature of the water in the tank, the qualitative kind of adiabatically performed work does not matter. No qualitative kind of adiabatic work has ever been observed to decrease the temperature of the water in the tank.

A change from one state to another, for example an increase of both temperature and volume, may be conducted in several stages, for example by externally supplied electrical work on a resistor in the body, and adiabatic expansion allowing the body to do work on the surroundings. It needs to be shown that the time order of the stages, and their relative magnitudes, does not affect the amount of adiabatic work that needs to be done for the change of state. According to one respected scholar: "Unfortunately, it does not seem that experiments of this kind have ever been carried out carefully. ... We must therefore admit that the statement which we have enunciated here, and which is equivalent to the first law of thermodynamics, is not well founded on direct experimental evidence." Another expression of this view is "no systematic precise experiments to verify this generalization directly have ever been attempted".

This kind of evidence, of independence of sequence of stages, combined with the above-mentioned evidence, of independence of qualitative kind of work, would show the existence of an important state variable that corresponds with adiabatic work, but not that such a state variable represented a conserved quantity. For the latter, another step of evidence is needed, which may be related to the concept of reversibility, as mentioned below.

That important state variable was first recognized and denoted $U$ by Clausius in 1850, but he did not then name it, and he defined it in terms not only of work but also of heat transfer in the same process. It was also independently recognized in 1850 by Rankine, who also denoted it $U$ ; and in 1851 by Kelvin who then called it "mechanical energy", and later "intrinsic energy". In 1865, after some hesitation, Clausius began calling his state function $U$ "energy". In 1882 it was named as the internal energy by Helmholtz. If only adiabatic processes were of interest, and heat could be ignored, the concept of internal energy would hardly arise or be needed. The relevant physics would be largely covered by the concept of potential energy, as was intended in the 1847 paper of Helmholtz on the principle of conservation of energy, though that did not deal with forces that cannot be described by a potential, and thus did not fully justify the principle. Moreover, that paper was critical of the early work of Joule that had by then been performed. A great merit of the internal energy concept is that it frees thermodynamics from a restriction to cyclic processes, and allows a treatment in terms of thermodynamic states.

In an adiabatic process, adiabatic work takes the system either from a reference state $O$ with internal energy $U(O)$ to an arbitrary one $A$ with internal energy $U(A)$, or from the state $A$ to the state $O$:

$$U(A)=U(O) - W^\mathrm{adiabatic}_{O\to A}\,\, \mathrm{or}\,\,U(O)=U(A) - W^\mathrm{adiabatic}_{A\to O}\,.$$

Except under the special, and strictly speaking, fictional, condition of reversibility, only one of the processes $\mathrm{adiabatic},\,O\to A$ or $\mathrm{adiabatic},\,{A\to O}\,$ is empirically feasible by a simple application of externally supplied work. The reason for this is given as the second law of thermodynamics and is not considered in the present article.

The fact of such irreversibility may be dealt with in two main ways, according to different points of view:

- Since the work of Bryan (1907), the most accepted way to deal with it nowadays, followed by Carathéodory, is to rely on the previously established concept of quasi-static processes, as follows. Actual physical processes of transfer of energy as work are always at least to some degree irreversible. The irreversibility is often due to mechanisms known as dissipative, that transform bulk kinetic energy into internal energy. Examples are friction and viscosity. If the process is performed more slowly, the frictional or viscous dissipation is less. In the limit of infinitely slow performance, the dissipation tends to zero and then the limiting process, though fictional rather than actual, is notionally reversible, and is called quasi-static. Throughout the course of the fictional limiting quasi-static process, the internal intensive variables of the system are equal to the external intensive variables, those that describe the reactive forces exerted by the surroundings. This can be taken to justify the formula
  $W^\text{adiabatic, quasi-static}_{A\to O} = -W^\text{adiabatic, quasi-static}_{O\to A}\,.$	1
- Another way to deal with it is to allow that experiments with processes of heat transfer to or from the system may be used to justify the formula (1) above. Moreover, it deals to some extent with the problem of lack of direct experimental evidence that the time order of stages of a process does not matter in the determination of internal energy. This way does not provide theoretical purity in terms of adiabatic work processes, but is empirically feasible, and is in accord with experiments actually done, such as the Joule experiments mentioned just above, and with older traditions.

The formula (1) above allows that to go by processes of quasi-static adiabatic work from the state $A$ to the state $B$ we can take a path that goes through the reference state $O$, since the quasi-static adiabatic work is independent of the path

$$-W^\mathrm{adiabatic,\,quasi-static}_{A\to B}=-W^\mathrm{adiabatic,\,quasi-static}_{A\to O}-W^\mathrm{adiabatic,\,quasi-static}_{O\to B} = W^\mathrm{adiabatic,\,quasi-static}_{O\to A}- W^\mathrm{adiabatic,\,quasi-static}_{O\to B} = -U(A) + U(B) = \Delta U$$

This kind of empirical evidence, coupled with theory of this kind, largely justifies the following statement:

For all adiabatic processes between two specified states of a closed system of any nature, the net work done is the same regardless the details of the process, and determines a state function called internal energy, U.

=== Adynamic processes ===
A complementary observable aspect of the first law is about heat transfer. Adynamic transfer of energy as heat can be measured empirically by changes in the surroundings of the system of interest by calorimetry. This again requires the existence of adiabatic enclosure of the entire process, system and surroundings, though the separating wall between the surroundings and the system is thermally conductive or radiatively permeable, not adiabatic. A calorimeter can rely on measurement of sensible heat, which requires the existence of thermometers and measurement of temperature change in bodies of known sensible heat capacity under specified conditions; or it can rely on the measurement of latent heat, through measurement of masses of material that change phase, at temperatures fixed by the occurrence of phase changes under specified conditions in bodies of known latent heat of phase change. The calorimeter can be calibrated by transferring an externally determined amount of heat into it, for instance from a resistive electrical heater inside the calorimeter through which a precisely known electric current is passed at a precisely known voltage for a precisely measured period of time. The calibration allows comparison of calorimetric measurement of quantity of heat transferred with quantity of energy transferred as (surroundings-based) work. According to one textbook, "The most common device for measuring $\Delta U$ is an adiabatic bomb calorimeter." According to another textbook, "Calorimetry is widely used in present day laboratories." According to one opinion, "Most thermodynamic data come from calorimetry".

When the system evolves with transfer of energy as heat, without energy being transferred as work, in an adynamic process, the heat transferred to the system is equal to the increase in its internal energy:

$$Q^\mathrm{adynamic}_{A\to B}=\Delta U\,.$$

=== General case for reversible processes ===
Heat transfer is practically reversible when it is driven by practically negligibly small temperature gradients. Work transfer is practically reversible when it occurs so slowly that there are no frictional effects within the system; frictional effects outside the system should also be zero if the process is to be reversible in the strict thermodynamic sense. For a particular reversible process in general, the work done reversibly on the system, $W^{\mathrm{path}\,P_0,\, \mathrm{reversible}}_{A\to B}$, and the heat transferred reversibly to the system, $Q^{\mathrm{path}\,P_0,\, \mathrm{reversible}}_{A\to B}$ are not required to occur respectively adiabatically or adynamically, but they must belong to the same particular process defined by its particular reversible path, $P_0$, through the space of thermodynamic states. Then the work and heat transfers can occur and be calculated simultaneously.

Putting the two complementary aspects together, the first law for a particular reversible process can be written

$$-W^{\mathrm{path}\,P_0,\, \mathrm{reversible}}_{A\to B} + Q^{\mathrm{path}\,P_0,\, \mathrm{reversible}}_{A\to B} = \Delta U\, .$$

This combined statement is the expression the first law of thermodynamics for reversible processes for closed systems.

In particular, if no work is done on a thermally isolated closed system we have

$$\Delta U = 0\,$$.

This is one aspect of the law of conservation of energy and can be stated:

The internal energy of an isolated system remains constant.

=== General case for irreversible processes ===
If, in a process of change of state of a closed system, the energy transfer is not under a practically zero temperature gradient, practically frictionless, and with nearly balanced forces, then the process is irreversible. Then the heat and work transfers may be difficult to calculate with high accuracy, although the simple equations for reversible processes still hold to a good approximation in the absence of composition changes. Importantly, the first law still holds and provides a check on the measurements and calculations of the work done irreversibly on the system, $W^{\mathrm{path}\,P_1,\, \mathrm{irreversible}}_{A\to B}$, and the heat transferred irreversibly to the system, $Q^{\mathrm{path}\,P_1,\, \mathrm{irreversible}}_{A\to B}$, which belong to the same particular process defined by its particular irreversible path, $P_1$, through the space of thermodynamic states.

$$-W^{\mathrm{path}\,P_1,\, \mathrm{irreversible}}_{A\to B} + Q^{\mathrm{path}\,P_1,\, \mathrm{irreversible}}_{A\to B} = \Delta U\, .$$

This means that the internal energy $U$ is a function of state and that the internal energy change $\Delta U$ between two states is a function only of the two states.

=== Overview of the weight of evidence for the law ===
The first law of thermodynamics is so general that its predictions cannot all be directly tested. In many properly conducted experiments it has been precisely supported, and never violated. Indeed, within its scope of applicability, the law is so reliably established, that, nowadays, rather than experiment being considered as testing the accuracy of the law, it is more practical and realistic to think of the law as testing the accuracy of experiment. An experimental result that seems to violate the law may be assumed to be inaccurate or wrongly conceived, for example due to failure to account for an important physical factor. Thus, some may regard it as a principle more abstract than a law.

== State functional formulation for infinitesimal processes ==
When the heat and work transfers in the equations above are infinitesimal in magnitude, they are often denoted by δ, rather than exact differentials denoted by d, as a reminder that heat and work do not describe the state of any system. The integral of an inexact differential depends upon the particular path taken through the space of thermodynamic parameters while the integral of an exact differential depends only upon the initial and final states. If the initial and final states are the same, then the integral of an inexact differential may or may not be zero, but the integral of an exact differential is always zero. The path taken by a thermodynamic system through a chemical or physical change is known as a thermodynamic process.

The first law for a closed homogeneous system may be stated in terms that include concepts that are established in the second law. The internal energy U may then be expressed as a function of the system's defining state variables S, entropy, and V, volume: U = U (S, V). In these terms, T, the system's temperature, and P, its pressure, are partial derivatives of U with respect to S and V. These variables are important throughout thermodynamics, though not necessary for the statement of the first law. Rigorously, they are defined only when the system is in its own state of internal thermodynamic equilibrium. For some purposes, the concepts provide good approximations for scenarios sufficiently near to the system's internal thermodynamic equilibrium.

The first law requires that:

$$dU=\delta Q-\delta W \, \,\,\,\,\,\,\,\,\,\,\,\,\,\,\,\,\,\,\,\,\, \text {(closed system, general process, quasi-static or irreversible).}$$

Then, for the fictive case of a reversible process, dU can be written in terms of exact differentials. One may imagine reversible changes, such that there is at each instant negligible departure from thermodynamic equilibrium within the system and between system and surroundings. Then, mechanical work is given by δW = −P dV and the quantity of heat added can be expressed as δQ = T dS. For these conditions

$$dU=TdS-PdV \, \,\,\,\,\,\,\,\,\,\,\,\,\,\,\,\, \text {(closed system, reversible process).}$$

While this has been shown here for reversible changes, it is valid more generally in the absence of chemical reactions or phase transitions, as U can be considered as a thermodynamic state function of the defining state variables S and V:

$dU=TdS-PdV \, \,\,\,\, \text {(closed system, general process without composition change).}$	2

Equation (2) is known as the fundamental thermodynamic relation for a closed system in the energy representation, for which the defining state variables are S and V, with respect to which T and P are partial derivatives of U. It is only in the reversible case or for a quasistatic process without composition change that the work done and heat transferred are given by −P dV and T dS.

In the case of a closed system in which the particles of the system are of different types and, because chemical reactions may occur, their respective numbers are not necessarily constant, the fundamental thermodynamic relation for dU becomes:

$$dU=TdS-PdV + \sum_i \mu_i dN_i.$$

where dN_{i} is the (small) increase in number of type-i particles in the reaction, and μ_{i} is known as the chemical potential of the type-i particles in the system. If dN_{i} is expressed in mol then μ_{i} is expressed in J/mol. If the system has more external mechanical variables than just the volume that can change, the fundamental thermodynamic relation further generalizes to:

$$dU = T dS - \sum_{i}X_{i}dx_{i} + \sum_{j}\mu_{j}dN_{j}.$$

Here the X_{i} are the generalized forces corresponding to the external variables x_{i}. The parameters X_{i} are independent of the size of the system and are called intensive parameters and the x_{i} are proportional to the size and called extensive parameters.

For an open system, there can be transfers of particles as well as energy into or out of the system during a process. For this case, the first law of thermodynamics still holds, in the form that the internal energy is a function of state and the change of internal energy in a process is a function only of its initial and final states, as noted in the section below headed First law of thermodynamics for open systems.

A useful idea from mechanics is that the energy gained by a particle is equal to the force applied to the particle multiplied by the displacement of the particle while that force is applied. Now consider the first law without the heating term: dU = −P dV. The pressure P can be viewed as a force (and in fact has units of force per unit area) while dV is the displacement (with units of distance times area). We may say, with respect to this work term, that a pressure difference forces a transfer of volume, and that the product of the two (work) is the amount of energy transferred out of the system as a result of the process. If one were to make this term negative then this would be the work done on the system.

It is useful to view the T dS term in the same light: here the temperature is known as a "generalized" force (rather than an actual mechanical force) and the entropy is a generalized displacement.

Similarly, a difference in chemical potential between groups of particles in the system drives a chemical reaction that changes the numbers of particles, and the corresponding product is the amount of chemical potential energy transformed in process. For example, consider a system consisting of two phases: liquid water and water vapor. There is a generalized "force" of evaporation that drives water molecules out of the liquid. There is a generalized "force" of condensation that drives vapor molecules out of the vapor. Only when these two "forces" (or chemical potentials) are equal is there equilibrium, and the net rate of transfer zero.

The two thermodynamic parameters that form a generalized force-displacement pair are called "conjugate variables". The two most familiar pairs are, of course, pressure-volume, and temperature-entropy.

== Fluid dynamics ==
In fluid dynamics, the first law of thermodynamics reads $\frac{D E_t}{D t}=\frac{D W}{D t} + \frac{D Q}{D t} \to \frac{D E_t}{D t} = \nabla\cdot({\mathbf \sigma\cdot v}) - \nabla\cdot{\mathbf q}$.

== Spatially inhomogeneous systems ==
Classical thermodynamics is initially focused on closed homogeneous systems (e.g. Planck 1897/1903), which might be regarded as 'zero-dimensional' in the sense that they have no spatial variation. But it is desired to study also systems with distinct internal motion and spatial inhomogeneity. For such systems, the principle of conservation of energy is expressed in terms not only of internal energy as defined for homogeneous systems, but also in terms of kinetic energy and potential energies of parts of the inhomogeneous system with respect to each other and with respect to long-range external forces. How the total energy of a system is allocated between these three more specific kinds of energy varies according to the purposes of different writers; this is because these components of energy are to some extent mathematical artefacts rather than actually measured physical quantities. For any closed homogeneous component of an inhomogeneous closed system, if $E$ denotes the total energy of that component system, one may write

$$E = E^{\mathrm {kin}} + E^{\mathrm {pot}} + U$$

where $E^{\mathrm {kin}}$ and $E^{\mathrm {pot}}$ denote respectively the total kinetic energy and the total potential energy of the component closed homogeneous system, and $U$ denotes its internal energy.

Potential energy can be exchanged with the surroundings of the system when the surroundings impose a force field, such as gravitational or electromagnetic, on the system.

A compound system consisting of two interacting closed homogeneous component subsystems has a potential energy of interaction $E^{\mathrm {pot}}_{12}$ between the subsystems. Thus, in an obvious notation, one may write

$$E = E^{\mathrm {kin}}_1 + E^{\mathrm {pot}}_1 + U_1 + E^{\mathrm {kin}}_2 + E^{\mathrm {pot}}_2 + U_2 + E^{\mathrm {pot}}_{12}$$

The quantity $E^{\mathrm {pot}}_{12}$ in general lacks an assignment to either subsystem in a way that is not arbitrary, and this stands in the way of a general non-arbitrary definition of transfer of energy as work. On occasions, authors make their various respective arbitrary assignments.

The distinction between internal and kinetic energy is hard to make in the presence of turbulent motion within the system, as friction gradually dissipates macroscopic kinetic energy of localised bulk flow into molecular random motion of molecules that is classified as internal energy. The rate of dissipation by friction of kinetic energy of localised bulk flow into internal energy, whether in turbulent or in streamlined flow, is an important quantity in non-equilibrium thermodynamics. This is a serious difficulty for attempts to define entropy for time-varying spatially inhomogeneous systems.

== First law of thermodynamics for open systems ==
For the first law of thermodynamics, there is no trivial passage of physical conception from the closed system view to an open system view. For closed systems, the concepts of an adiabatic enclosure and of an adiabatic wall are fundamental. Matter and internal energy cannot permeate or penetrate such a wall. For an open system, there is a wall that allows penetration by matter. In general, matter in diffusive motion carries with it some internal energy, and some microscopic potential energy changes accompany the motion. An open system is not adiabatically enclosed.

There are some cases in which a process for an open system can, for particular purposes, be considered as if it were for a closed system. In an open system, by definition hypothetically or potentially, matter can pass between the system and its surroundings. But when, in a particular case, the process of interest involves only hypothetical or potential but no actual passage of matter, the process can be considered as if it were for a closed system.

=== Internal energy for an open system ===
Since the revised and more rigorous definition of the internal energy of a closed system rests upon the possibility of processes by which adiabatic work takes the system from one state to another, this leaves a problem for the definition of internal energy for an open system, for which adiabatic work is not in general possible. According to Max Born, the transfer of matter and energy across an open connection "cannot be reduced to mechanics". In contrast to the case of closed systems, for open systems, in the presence of diffusion, there is no unconstrained and unconditional physical distinction between convective transfer of internal energy by bulk flow of matter, the transfer of internal energy without transfer of matter (usually called heat conduction and work transfer), and change of various potential energies. The older traditional way and the conceptually revised (Carathéodory) way agree that there is no physically unique definition of heat and work transfer processes between open systems.

In particular, between two otherwise isolated open systems an adiabatic wall is by definition impossible. This problem is solved by recourse to the principle of conservation of energy. This principle allows a composite isolated system to be derived from two other component non-interacting isolated systems, in such a way that the total energy of the composite isolated system is equal to the sum of the total energies of the two component isolated systems. Two previously isolated systems can be subjected to the thermodynamic operation of placement between them of a wall permeable to matter and energy, followed by a time for establishment of a new thermodynamic state of internal equilibrium in the new single unpartitioned system. The internal energies of the initial two systems and of the final new system, considered respectively as closed systems as above, can be measured. Then the law of conservation of energy requires that

$$\Delta U_s+\Delta U_o=0\, ,$$

where ΔU_{s} and ΔU_{o} denote the changes in internal energy of the system and of its surroundings respectively. This is a statement of the first law of thermodynamics for a transfer between two otherwise isolated open systems, that fits well with the conceptually revised and rigorous statement of the law stated above.

For the thermodynamic operation of adding two systems with internal energies U_{1} and U_{2}, to produce a new system with internal energy U, one may write U = U_{1} + U_{2}; the reference states for U, U_{1} and U_{2} should be specified accordingly, maintaining also that the internal energy of a system be proportional to its mass, so that the internal energies are extensive variables.

There is a sense in which this kind of additivity expresses a fundamental postulate that goes beyond the simplest ideas of classical closed system thermodynamics; the extensivity of some variables is not obvious, and needs explicit expression; indeed one author goes so far as to say that it could be recognized as a fourth law of thermodynamics, though this is not repeated by other authors.

Also of course

$$\Delta N_s+\Delta N_o=0\, ,$$

where ΔN_{s} and ΔN_{o} denote the changes in mole number of a component substance of the system and of its surroundings respectively. This is a statement of the law of conservation of mass.

=== Process of transfer of matter between an open system and its surroundings ===
A system connected to its surroundings only through contact by a single permeable wall, but otherwise isolated, is an open system. If it is initially in a state of contact equilibrium with a surrounding subsystem, a thermodynamic process of transfer of matter can be made to occur between them if the surrounding subsystem is subjected to some thermodynamic operation, for example, removal of a partition between it and some further surrounding subsystem. The removal of the partition in the surroundings initiates a process of exchange between the system and its contiguous surrounding subsystem.

An example is evaporation. One may consider an open system consisting of a collection of liquid, enclosed except where it is allowed to evaporate into or to receive condensate from its vapor above it, which may be considered as its contiguous surrounding subsystem, and subject to control of its volume and temperature.

A thermodynamic process might be initiated by a thermodynamic operation in the surroundings, that mechanically increases in the controlled volume of the vapor. Some mechanical work will be done within the surroundings by the vapor, but also some of the parent liquid will evaporate and enter the vapor collection which is the contiguous surrounding subsystem. Some internal energy will accompany the vapor that leaves the system, but it will not make sense to try to uniquely identify part of that internal energy as heat and part of it as work. Consequently, the energy transfer that accompanies the transfer of matter between the system and its surrounding subsystem cannot be uniquely split into heat and work transfers to or from the open system. The component of total energy transfer that accompanies the transfer of vapor into the surrounding subsystem is customarily called 'latent heat of evaporation', but this use of the word heat is a quirk of customary historical language, not in strict compliance with the thermodynamic definition of transfer of energy as heat. In this example, kinetic energy of bulk flow and potential energy with respect to long-range external forces such as gravity are both considered to be zero. The first law of thermodynamics refers to the change of internal energy of the open system, between its initial and final states of internal equilibrium.

=== Open system with multiple contacts ===
An open system can be in contact equilibrium with several other systems at once.

This includes cases in which there is contact equilibrium between the system, and several subsystems in its surroundings, including separate connections with subsystems through walls that are permeable to the transfer of matter and internal energy as heat and allowing friction of passage of the transferred matter, but immovable, and separate connections through adiabatic walls with others, and separate connections through diathermic walls impermeable to matter with yet others. Because there are physically separate connections that are permeable to energy but impermeable to matter, between the system and its surroundings, energy transfers between them can occur with definite heat and work characters. Conceptually essential here is that the internal energy transferred with the transfer of matter is measured by a variable that is mathematically independent of the variables that measure heat and work.

With such independence of variables, the total increase of internal energy in the process is then determined as the sum of the internal energy transferred from the surroundings with the transfer of matter through the walls that are permeable to it, and of the internal energy transferred to the system as heat through the diathermic walls, and of the energy transferred to the system as work through the adiabatic walls, including the energy transferred to the system by long-range forces. These simultaneously transferred quantities of energy are defined by events in the surroundings of the system. Because the internal energy transferred with matter is not in general uniquely resolvable into heat and work components, the total energy transfer cannot in general be uniquely resolved into heat and work components. Under these conditions, the following formula can describe the process in terms of externally defined thermodynamic variables, as a statement of the first law of thermodynamics:

$\Delta U_0 \,=\,Q\, -\, W\, -\, \sum_{i=1}^m \Delta U_i \, \,\,\,\, \text {(suitably defined surrounding subsystems, general process, quasi-static or irreversible),}$	3

where ΔU_{0} denotes the change of internal energy of the system, and ΔU_{i} denotes the change of internal energy of the ith of the m surrounding subsystems that are in open contact with the system, due to transfer between the system and that ith surrounding subsystem, and Q denotes the internal energy transferred as heat from the heat reservoir of the surroundings to the system, and W denotes the energy transferred from the system to the surrounding subsystems that are in adiabatic connection with it. The case of a wall that is permeable to matter and can move so as to allow transfer of energy as work is not considered here.

==== Combination of first and second laws ====
If the system is described by the energetic fundamental equation, U_{0} = U_{0}(S, V, N_{j}), and if the process can be described in the quasi-static formalism, in terms of the internal state variables of the system, then the process can also be described by a combination of the first and second laws of thermodynamics, by the formula

$\mathrm d U_0 \,=\, T\, \mathrm d S\, -\, P\, \mathrm d V\, +\, \sum_{j=1}^n \mu _j \, \mathrm d N_j$	4

where there are n chemical constituents of the system and permeably connected surrounding subsystems, and where T, S, P, V, N_{j}, and μ_{j}, are defined as above.

For a general natural process, there is no immediate term-wise correspondence between equations (3) and (4), because they describe the process in different conceptual frames.

Nevertheless, a conditional correspondence exists. There are three relevant kinds of wall here: purely diathermal, adiabatic, and permeable to matter. If two of those kinds of wall are sealed off, leaving only one that permits transfers of energy, as work, as heat, or with matter, then the remaining permitted terms correspond precisely. If two of the kinds of wall are left unsealed, then energy transfer can be shared between them, so that the two remaining permitted terms do not correspond precisely.

For the special fictive case of quasi-static transfers, there is a simple correspondence. For this, it is supposed that the system has multiple areas of contact with its surroundings. There are pistons that allow adiabatic work, purely diathermal walls, and open connections with surrounding subsystems of completely controllable chemical potential (or equivalent controls for charged species). Then, for a suitable fictive quasi-static transfer, one can write

$$\delta Q \,=\, T\, \mathrm d S-T\textstyle{\sum_{i}}s_i\,dN_i\,\text{   and    }\delta W \,=\, P\, \mathrm d V\,\, \,\,\,\, \text {(suitably defined surrounding subsystems, quasi-static transfers of energy)},$$

where $dN_i$ is the added amount of species $i$ and $s_i$ is the corresponding molar entropy.

For fictive quasi-static transfers for which the chemical potentials in the connected surrounding subsystems are suitably controlled, these can be put into equation (4) to yield

$\mathrm d U_0 \,=\, \delta Q\, -\, \delta W\, +\, \sum_{j=1}^n h _j \, \mathrm d N_j\, \,\,\,\,\,\, \text {(suitably defined surrounding subsystems, quasi-static transfers)}.$	5

where $h_i$ is the molar enthalpy of species $i$.

=== Non-equilibrium transfers ===
The transfer of energy between an open system and a single contiguous subsystem of its surroundings is considered also in non-equilibrium thermodynamics. The problem of definition arises also in this case. It may be allowed that the wall between the system and the subsystem is not only permeable to matter and to internal energy, but also may be movable so as to allow work to be done when the two systems have different pressures. In this case, the transfer of energy as heat is not defined.

The first law of thermodynamics for any process on the specification of equation (3) can be defined as

$\mathrm \Delta U \,=\,\Delta Q\, -\, p \Delta V\, +\, \sum_{j=1}^n h _j \, \mathrm \Delta N_j\, \,\,\,\,\,\,.$	6

where ΔU denotes the change of internal energy of the system, Δ Q denotes the internal energy transferred as heat from the heat reservoir of the surroundings to the system, p Δ V denotes the work of the system and $h_i$ is the molar enthalpy of species $i$, coming into the system from the surrounding that is in contact with the system.

Formula (6) is valid in general case, both for quasi-static and for irreversible processes. The situation of the quasi-static process is considered in the previous Section, which in our terms defines

$\mathrm dU = T\,dS - \, p \Delta V\, + \sum_{\alpha} \, \mu_\alpha \, \Delta N_\alpha,$	7

$\mathrm dS = \frac{\Delta E}{T}, \quad \Delta E = \Delta Q + \sum_{\alpha} \,\eta_\alpha \, \Delta N_\alpha.$	8

To describe deviation of the thermodynamic system from equilibrium, in addition to fundamental variables that are used to fix the equilibrium state, as was described above, a set of variables $\xi_1, \xi_2,\ldots$ that are called internal variables have been introduced, which allows to formulate for the general case

$\mathrm dU = T\,dS - \, p \Delta V\, + \sum_{j} \, \Xi_{j} \,\Delta \xi_j + \sum_\alpha \, \mu_\alpha \, \Delta n_\alpha,$	9

$\mathrm dS = \frac{\Delta E}{T}, \quad \Delta E = \Delta Q - \sum_{j} \, \Xi_{j} \,\Delta \xi_j + \sum_{\alpha} \,\eta_\alpha \, \Delta n_\alpha.$	10

Methods for study of non-equilibrium processes mostly deal with spatially continuous flow systems. In this case, the open connection between system and surroundings is usually taken to fully surround the system, so that there are no separate connections impermeable to matter but permeable to heat. Except for the special case mentioned above when there is no actual transfer of matter, which can be treated as if for a closed system, in strictly defined thermodynamic terms, it follows that transfer of energy as heat is not defined. In this sense, there is no such thing as 'heat flow' for a continuous-flow open system. Properly, for closed systems, one speaks of transfer of internal energy as heat, but in general, for open systems, one can speak safely only of transfer of internal energy. A factor here is that there are often cross-effects between distinct transfers, for example that transfer of one substance may cause transfer of another even when the latter has zero chemical potential gradient.

Usually transfer between a system and its surroundings applies to transfer of a state variable, and obeys a balance law, that the amount lost by the donor system is equal to the amount gained by the receptor system. Heat is not a state variable. For his 1947 definition of "heat transfer" for discrete open systems, the author Prigogine carefully explains at some length that his definition of it does not obey a balance law. He describes this as paradoxical.

The situation is clarified by Gyarmati, who shows that his definition of "heat transfer", for continuous-flow systems, really refers not specifically to heat, but rather to transfer of internal energy, as follows. He considers a conceptual small cell in a situation of continuous-flow as a system defined in the so-called Lagrangian way, moving with the local center of mass. The flow of matter across the boundary is zero when considered as a flow of total mass. Nevertheless, if the material constitution is of several chemically distinct components that can diffuse with respect to one another, the system is considered to be open, the diffusive flows of the components being defined with respect to the center of mass of the system, and balancing one another as to mass transfer. Still there can be a distinction between bulk flow of internal energy and diffusive flow of internal energy in this case, because the internal energy density does not have to be constant per unit mass of material, and allowing for non-conservation of internal energy because of local conversion of kinetic energy of bulk flow to internal energy by viscosity.

Gyarmati shows that his definition of "the heat flow vector" is strictly speaking a definition of flow of internal energy, not specifically of heat, and so it turns out that his use here of the word heat is contrary to the strict thermodynamic definition of heat, though it is more or less compatible with historical custom, that often enough did not clearly distinguish between heat and internal energy; he writes "that this relation must be considered to be the exact definition of the concept of heat flow, fairly loosely used in experimental physics and heat technics". Apparently in a different frame of thinking from that of the above-mentioned paradoxical usage in the earlier sections of the historic 1947 work by Prigogine, about discrete systems, this usage of Gyarmati is consistent with the later sections of the same 1947 work by Prigogine, about continuous-flow systems, which use the term "heat flux" in just this way. This usage is also followed by Glansdorff and Prigogine in their 1971 text about continuous-flow systems. They write: "Again the flow of internal energy may be split into a convection flow ρuv and a conduction flow. This conduction flow is by definition the heat flow W. Therefore: j[U] = ρuv + W where u denotes the [internal] energy per unit mass. [These authors actually use the symbols E and e to denote internal energy but their notation has been changed here to accord with the notation of the present article. These authors actually use the symbol U to refer to total energy, including kinetic energy of bulk flow.]" This usage is followed also by other writers on non-equilibrium thermodynamics such as Lebon, Jou, and Casas-Vásquez, and de Groot and Mazur. This usage is described by Bailyn as stating the non-convective flow of internal energy, and is listed as his definition number 1, according to the first law of thermodynamics. This usage is also followed by workers in the kinetic theory of gases. This is not the ad hoc definition of "reduced heat flux" of Rolf Haase.

In the case of a flowing system of only one chemical constituent, in the Lagrangian representation, there is no distinction between bulk flow and diffusion of matter. Moreover, the flow of matter is zero into or out of the cell that moves with the local center of mass. In effect, in this description, one is dealing with a system effectively closed to the transfer of matter. But still one can validly talk of a distinction between bulk flow and diffusive flow of internal energy, the latter driven by a temperature gradient within the flowing material, and being defined with respect to the local center of mass of the bulk flow. In this case of a virtually closed system, because of the zero matter transfer, as noted above, one can safely distinguish between transfer of energy as work, and transfer of internal energy as heat.

== See also ==
- Laws of thermodynamics
- Perpetual motion
- Microstate (statistical mechanics) – includes microscopic definitions of internal energy, heat and work
- Entropy production
- Relativistic heat conduction
