= State function =

Function describing equilibrium states of a system

In the thermodynamics of equilibrium, a state function, function of state, or point function for a thermodynamic system is a function relating several state variables or state quantities (that describe equilibrium states of a system) that depend only on the current equilibrium thermodynamic state of the system (e.g. gas, liquid, solid, crystal, or emulsion), not the path which the system has taken to reach that state. A state function describes equilibrium states of a system, thus also describing the type of system. A state variable is typically a state function so the determination of other state variable values at an equilibrium state also determines the value of the state variable as the state function at that state. The ideal gas law is a good example. In this law, one state variable (e.g., pressure, volume, temperature, or the amount of substance in a gaseous equilibrium system) is a function of other state variables so is regarded as a state function. A state function could also describe the number of a certain type of atoms or molecules in a gaseous, liquid, or solid form in a heterogeneous or homogeneous mixture, or the amount of energy required to create such a system or change the system into a different equilibrium state.

Internal energy, enthalpy, and entropy are examples of state quantities or state functions because they quantitatively describe an equilibrium state of a thermodynamic system, regardless of how the system has arrived in that state. They are expressed by exact differentials. In contrast, mechanical work and heat are process quantities or path functions because their values depend on a specific "transition" (or "path") between two equilibrium states that a system has taken to reach the final equilibrium state, being expressed by inexact differentials. Exchanged heat (in certain discrete amounts) can be associated with changes of state function such as enthalpy. The description of the system heat exchange is done by a state function, and thus enthalpy changes point to an amount of heat. This can also apply to entropy when heat is compared to temperature. The description breaks down for quantities exhibiting hysteresis.

== History ==
It is likely that the term "functions of state" was used in a loose sense during the 1850s and 1860s by those such as Rudolf Clausius, William Rankine, Peter Tait, and William Thomson. By the 1870s, the term had acquired a use of its own. In his 1873 paper "Graphical Methods in the Thermodynamics of Fluids", Willard Gibbs states: "The quantities v, p, t, ε, and η are determined when the state of the body is given, and it may be permitted to call them functions of the state of the body."

== Overview ==
A thermodynamic system is described by a number of thermodynamic parameters (e.g. temperature, volume, or pressure) which are not necessarily independent. The number of parameters needed to describe the system is the dimension of the state space of the system (D). For example, a monatomic gas with a fixed number of particles is a simple case of a two-dimensional system (D = 2). Any two-dimensional system is uniquely specified by two parameters. Choosing a different pair of parameters, such as pressure and volume instead of pressure and temperature, creates a different coordinate system in two-dimensional thermodynamic state space but is otherwise equivalent. Pressure and temperature can be used to find volume, pressure and volume can be used to find temperature, and temperature and volume can be used to find pressure. An analogous statement holds for higher-dimensional spaces, as described by the state postulate.

Generally, a state space is defined by an equation of the form $F(P, V, T, \ldots) = 0$, where P denotes pressure, T denotes temperature, V denotes volume, and the ellipsis denotes other possible state variables like particle number N and entropy S. If the state space is two-dimensional as in the above example, it can be visualized as a three-dimensional graph (a surface in three-dimensional space). However, the labels of the axes are not unique (since there are more than three state variables in this case), and only two independent variables are necessary to define the state.

When a system changes state continuously, it traces out a "path" in the state space. The path can be specified by noting the values of the state parameters as the system traces out the path, whether as a function of time or a function of some other external variable. For example, having the pressure P(t) and volume V(t) as functions of time from time t_{0} to t_{1} will specify a path in two-dimensional state space. Any function of time can then be integrated over the path. For example, to calculate the work done by the system from time t_{0} to time t_{1}, calculate $W(t_0,t_1) = \int_0^1 P \, dV = \int_{t_0}^{t_1} P(t) \frac{dV(t)}{dt} \, dt$. In order to calculate the work W in the above integral, the functions P(t) and V(t) must be known at each time t over the entire path. In contrast, a state function only depends upon the system parameters' values at the endpoints of the path. For example, the following equation can be used to calculate the work plus the integral of V dP over the path:

$$\begin{align}
\Phi(t_0,t_1) &= \int_{t_0}^{t_1}P\frac{dV}{dt}\,dt
+ \int_{t_0}^{t_1}V\frac{dP}{dt}\,dt \\
&= \int_{t_0}^{t_1}\frac{d(PV)}{dt}\,dt = P(t_1)V(t_1)-P(t_0)V(t_0).
\end{align}$$

In the equation, $\frac{d(PV)}{dt}dt = d(PV)$ can be expressed as the exact differential of the function P(t)V(t). Therefore, the integral can be expressed as the difference in the value of P(t)V(t) at the end points of the integration. The product PV is therefore a state function of the system.

The notation d will be used for an exact differential. In other words, the integral of dΦ will be equal to Φ(t_{1}) − Φ(t_{0}). The symbol δ will be reserved for an inexact differential, which cannot be integrated without full knowledge of the path. For example, δW = PdV will be used to denote an infinitesimal increment of work.

State functions represent quantities or properties of a thermodynamic system, while non-state functions represent a process during which the state functions change. For example, the state function PV is proportional to the internal energy of an ideal gas, but the work W is the amount of energy transferred as the system performs work. Internal energy is identifiable; it is a particular form of energy. Work is the amount of energy that has changed its form or location.

== List of state functions ==
The following are considered to be state functions in thermodynamics:

- Mass
- Energy (E)
  - Enthalpy (H)
  - Internal energy (U)
  - Gibbs free energy (G)
  - Helmholtz free energy (F)
- Entropy (S)
- Pressure (P)
- Temperature (T)
- Volume (V)
- Chemical composition
- Pressure altitude
- Specific volume (v) or its reciprocal density (ρ)
- Particle number (n_{i})

== See also ==
- Markov property
- Conservative vector field
- Nonholonomic system
- Equation of state
- State variable
