= Process function =

Thermodynamic quantity

In thermodynamics, a quantity that is well defined so as to describe the path of a process through the equilibrium state space of a thermodynamic system is termed a process function, or, alternatively, a process quantity, or a path function. As an example, mechanical work and heat are process functions because they describe quantitatively the transition between equilibrium states of a thermodynamic system.

== Path functions ==
Path functions depend on the path taken to reach one state from another. Different routes give different quantities. Examples of path functions include work, heat and arc length. In contrast to path functions, state functions are independent of the path taken. Thermodynamic state variables are point functions, differing from path functions. For a given state, considered as a point, there is a definite value for each state variable and state function.

== Differentials ==
Infinitesimal changes in a process function X are often indicated by δX to distinguish them from infinitesimal changes in a state function Y which is written dY. The quantity dY is an exact differential, while δX is not, it is an inexact differential. Infinitesimal changes in a process function may be integrated, but the integral between two states depends on the particular path taken between the two states, whereas the integral of a state function is simply the difference of the state functions at the two points, independent of the path taken.

== Holonomic or non-holonomic ==
In general, a process function X may be either holonomic or non-holonomic. For a holonomic process function, an auxiliary state function (or integrating factor) λ may be defined such that Y = λX is a state function. For a non-holonomic process function, no such function may be defined. In other words, for a holonomic process function, λ may be defined such that dY = λδX is an exact differential. For example, thermodynamic work is a holonomic process function since the integrating factor λ = 1/p (where p is pressure) will yield exact differential of the volume state function dV = δW/p. The second law of thermodynamics as stated by Carathéodory essentially amounts to the statement that heat is a holonomic process function since the integrating factor λ = 1/T (where T is temperature) will yield the exact differential of an entropy state function dS = δQ/T.

== See also ==
- Thermodynamics
