= Internal energy =

Energy contained within a system

- Common symbols: $U$
- SI unit: J
- In SI base units: kg⋅m^{2}⋅s^{-2}
- Derivations from other quantities: $\Delta U = \sum_i p_iE_i \!$ $\Delta U = nC_V \Delta T\!$

The internal energy, in thermodynamics, is the property that defines the energy of a thermodynamic system usually in the absence of effects from electric, magnetic or any other external fields which can be source of potential energy. It also excludes the kinetic energy of motion. The notion of internal energy is present in the expression of the first law of thermodynamics as a state variable, as originally formulated by the German scientist Rudolf Clausius, one of the founders of thermodynamics who is also the author of the notion of entropy as a state variable.

The total internal energy of a system cannot practically be measured. Thermodynamics concerns changes in the internal energy, not its absolute value. The processes that change the internal energy are transfers of energy or matter, into or out of the system, as heat or by thermodynamic work. These processes can be measured as changes in the system's properties, such as temperature, entropy, volume, electric polarization, and molar constitution. The internal energy depends only on the internal state of the system and not on the particular choice from many possible processes by which energy may pass into or out of the system. It is a state variable, a thermodynamic potential, and an extensive property.

Without a thermodynamic process, the internal energy of an isolated system does not change, as expressed in the law of conservation of energy, a foundation of the first law of thermodynamics. Without transfer of matter, internal energy changes equal the algebraic sum of the heat transferred and the thermodynamic work done.

Thermodynamics defines internal energy at macroscopic scale, for the body as a whole. In statistical mechanics, the internal energy of a body can be analyzed microscopically in terms of the kinetic energies of microscopic motion of the system's particles from translations, rotations, and vibrations, and of the potential energies associated with microscopic forces, including chemical bonds.

The unit of energy in the International System of Units (SI) is the joule (J). The internal energy relative to the mass with unit J/kg is the specific internal energy. The corresponding quantity relative to the amount of substance with unit J/mol is the molar internal energy.

== Cardinal functions ==
The internal energy of a system depends on its entropy S, its volume V and its number of massive particles: U(S,V,{N_{j}}). It expresses the thermodynamics of a system in the energy representation. As a function of state, its arguments are exclusively extensive variables of state, which is why it is sometimes called a cardinal function of state. Alongside the internal energy, the other cardinal function of state of a thermodynamic system is its entropy, as a function, S(U,V,{N_{j}}), of the same list of extensive variables of state, except that the entropy, S, is replaced in the list by the internal energy, U. It expresses the entropy representation.

Each cardinal function is a monotonic function of each of its natural or canonical variables. Each provides its characteristic or fundamental equation, for example U = U(S,V,{N_{j}}), that by itself contains all thermodynamic information about the system. The fundamental equations for the two cardinal functions can in principle be interconverted by solving, for example, U = U(S,V,{N_{j}}) for S, to get S = S(U,V,{N_{j}}).

In contrast, Legendre transformations are necessary to derive fundamental equations for other thermodynamic potentials and Massieu functions. The entropy as a function only of extensive state variables is the one and only cardinal function of state for the generation of Massieu functions. It is not itself customarily designated a 'Massieu function', though rationally it might be thought of as such, corresponding to the term 'thermodynamic potential', which includes the internal energy.

For real and practical systems, explicit expressions of the fundamental equations are almost always unavailable, but the functional relations exist in principle. Formal, in principle, manipulations of them are valuable for the understanding of thermodynamics.

== Description and definition ==
The internal energy $U$ of a given state of the system is determined relative to that of a standard state of the system, by adding up the macroscopic transfers of energy that accompany a change of state from the reference state to the given state:

$$\Delta U = \sum_i  E_i,$$

where $\Delta U$ denotes the difference between the internal energy of the given state and that of the reference state, and the $E_i$ are the various energies transferred to the system in the steps from the reference state to the given state. It is the energy needed to create the given state of the system from the reference state. From a non-relativistic microscopic point of view, it may be divided into microscopic potential energy, $U_\text{micro,pot}$, and microscopic kinetic energy, $U_\text{micro,kin}$, components:

$$U = U_\text{micro,pot} + U_\text{micro,kin}.$$

The microscopic kinetic energy of a system arises as the sum of the motions of all the system's particles with respect to the center-of-mass frame, whether it be the motion of atoms, molecules, atomic nuclei, electrons, or other particles (often expressed as thermal engergy/ temperature). The microscopic potential energy algebraic summative components are those of the chemical and nuclear particle bonds (e.g. intermolecular forces), and the physical force fields within the system, such as due to internal induced electric or magnetic dipole moment (e.g. intramolecular forces), as well as the energy of deformation of solids (stress-strain). Usually, the split into microscopic kinetic and potential energies is outside the scope of macroscopic thermodynamics.

Internal energy does not include the energy due to motion or location of a system as a whole. That is to say, it excludes any kinetic or potential energy the body may have because of its motion or location in external gravitational, electrostatic, or electromagnetic fields. It does, however, include the contribution of such a field to the energy due to the coupling of the internal degrees of freedom of the system with the field. In such a case, the field is included in the thermodynamic description of the object in the form of an additional external parameter.

For practical considerations in thermodynamics or engineering, it is rarely necessary, convenient, nor even possible, to consider all energies belonging to the total intrinsic energy of a sample system, such as the energy given by the equivalence of mass. Typically, descriptions only include components relevant to the system under study. Indeed, in most systems under consideration, especially through thermodynamics, it is impossible to calculate the total internal energy. Therefore, a convenient null reference point may be chosen for the internal energy.

The internal energy is an extensive property: it depends on the size of the system, or on the amount of substance it contains.

At any temperature greater than absolute zero, microscopic potential energy and kinetic energy are constantly converted into one another, but the sum remains constant in an isolated system (cf. table). In the classical picture of thermodynamics, kinetic energy vanishes at zero temperature and the internal energy is purely potential energy. However, quantum mechanics has demonstrated that even at zero temperature particles maintain a residual energy of motion, the zero point energy. A system at absolute zero is merely in its quantum-mechanical ground state, the lowest energy state available. At absolute zero a system of given composition has attained its minimum attainable entropy.

The microscopic kinetic energy portion of the internal energy gives rise to the temperature of the system. Statistical mechanics relates the pseudo-random kinetic energy of individual particles to the mean kinetic energy of the entire ensemble of particles comprising a system. Furthermore, it relates the mean microscopic kinetic energy to the macroscopically observed empirical property that is expressed as temperature of the system. While temperature is an intensive measure, this energy expresses the concept as an extensive property of the system, often referred to as the thermal energy, The scaling property between temperature and thermal energy is the entropy change of the system.

Statistical mechanics considers any system to be statistically distributed across an ensemble of $N$ microstates. In a system that is in thermodynamic contact equilibrium with a heat reservoir, each microstate has an energy $E_i$ and is associated with a probability $p_i$. The internal energy is the mean value of the system's total energy, i.e., the sum of all microstate energies, each weighted by its probability of occurrence:

$$U = \sum_{i=1}^N p_i \,E_i.$$

This is the statistical expression of the law of conservation of energy.

Interactions of thermodynamic systems
Type of system	Mass flow	Work	Heat
Open	✓	✓	✓
Closed	✗	✓	✓
Thermally isolated	✗	✓	✗
Mechanically isolated	✗	✗	✓
Isolated	✗	✗	✗

=== Internal energy changes ===
Thermodynamics is chiefly concerned with the changes in internal energy $\Delta U$.

For a closed system, with mass transfer excluded, the changes in internal energy are due to heat transfer $Q$ and due to thermodynamic work $W$ done by the system on its surroundings. (Note: This article uses the sign convention of the mechanical work as often defined in engineering, which is different from the convention used in physics and chemistry; in engineering, work performed by the system against the environment, e.g., a system expansion, is taken to be positive, while in physics and chemistry, it is taken to be negative.) Accordingly, the internal energy change $\Delta U$ for a process may be written
$$\Delta U = Q - W \quad \text{(closed system, no transfer of substance)}.$$

When a closed system receives energy as heat, this energy increases the internal energy. It is distributed between microscopic kinetic and microscopic potential energies. In general, thermodynamics does not trace this distribution. In an ideal gas all of the extra energy results in a temperature increase, as it is stored solely as microscopic kinetic energy; such heating is said to be sensible.

A second kind of mechanism of change in the internal energy of a closed system changed is in its doing of work on its surroundings. Such work may be simply mechanical, as when the system expands to drive a piston, or, for example, when the system changes its electric polarization so as to drive a change in the electric field in the surroundings.

If the system is not closed, the third mechanism that can increase the internal energy is transfer of substance into the system. This increase, $\Delta U_\mathrm{matter}$ cannot be split into heat and work components. If the system is so set up physically that heat transfer and work that it does are by pathways separate from and independent of matter transfer, then the transfers of energy add to change the internal energy:
$$\Delta U = Q - W + \Delta U_\text{matter} \quad \text{(matter transfer pathway separate from heat and work transfer pathways)}.$$

If a system undergoes certain phase transformations while being heated, such as melting and vaporization, it may be observed that the temperature of the system does not change until the entire sample has completed the transformation. The energy introduced into the system while the temperature does not change is called latent energy or latent heat, in contrast to sensible heat, which is associated with temperature change.

== Internal energy of the ideal gas ==
Thermodynamics often uses the concept of the ideal gas for teaching purposes, and as an approximation for working systems. The ideal gas consists of particles considered as point objects that interact only by elastic collisions and fill a volume such that their mean free path between collisions is much larger than their diameter. Such systems approximate monatomic gases such as helium and other noble gases. For an ideal gas the kinetic energy consists only of the translational energy of the individual atoms. Monatomic particles do not possess rotational or vibrational degrees of freedom, and are not electronically excited to higher energies except at very high temperatures.

Therefore, the internal energy of an ideal gas depends solely on its temperature (and the number of gas particles): $U = U(N,T)$. It is not dependent on other thermodynamic quantities such as pressure or density.

The internal energy of an ideal gas is proportional to its amount of substance (number of moles) $N$ and to its temperature $T$

$$U = c_V N T,$$

where $c_V$ is the isochoric (at constant volume) molar heat capacity of the gas; $c_V$ is constant for an ideal gas. The internal energy of any gas (ideal or not) may be written as a function of the three extensive properties $S$, $V$, $N$ (entropy, volume, number of moles). In case of the ideal gas it is in the following way

$$U(S,V,N) = \mathrm{const}  \cdot  e^\frac{S}{c_V N}    V^\frac{-R}{c_V}  N^\frac{R+c_V}{c_V},$$

where $\mathrm {const}$ is an arbitrary positive constant and where $R$ is the universal gas constant. It is easily seen that $U$ is a linearly homogeneous function of the three variables (that is, it is extensive in these variables), and that it is weakly convex. Knowing temperature and pressure to be the derivatives $T = \frac{\partial U}{\partial S},$ $P = -\frac{\partial U}{\partial V},$ the ideal gas law $PV = NRT$ immediately follows as below:

$$T = \frac{\partial U}{\partial S} = \frac{U}{c_V N}$$
$$P = -\frac{\partial U}{\partial V} = U \frac{R}{c_V V}$$
$$\frac{P}{T} = \frac{\frac{U R}{c_V V}}{\frac{U}{c_V N}} = \frac{N R}{V}$$
$$PV = NRT$$

== Internal energy of a closed thermodynamic system ==
The above summation of all components of change in internal energy assumes that a positive energy denotes heat added to the system or the negative of work done by the system on its surroundings.

This relationship may be expressed in infinitesimal terms using the differentials of each term, though only the internal energy is an exact differential. For a closed system, with transfers only as heat and work, the change in the internal energy is

$$\mathrm{d} U = \delta Q - \delta W,$$

expressing the first law of thermodynamics. It may be expressed in terms of other thermodynamic parameters. Each term is composed of an intensive variable (a generalized force) and its conjugate infinitesimal extensive variable (a generalized displacement).

For example, the mechanical work done by the system may be related to the pressure $P$ and volume change $\mathrm{d}V$. The pressure is the intensive generalized force, while the volume change is the extensive generalized displacement:

$$\delta W = P \, \mathrm{d}V.$$

This defines the direction of work, $W$, to be energy transfer from the working system to the surroundings, indicated by a positive term. Taking the direction of heat transfer $Q$ to be into the working fluid and assuming a reversible process, the heat is

$$\delta Q = T \mathrm{d}S,$$

where $T$ denotes the temperature, and $S$ denotes the entropy.

The change in internal energy becomes

$$\mathrm{d}U = T \, \mathrm{d}S - P \, \mathrm{d}V.$$

=== Changes due to temperature and volume ===
The expression relating changes in internal energy to changes in temperature and volume is

$$\mathrm{d}U =C_{V} \, \mathrm{d}T +\left[T\left(\frac{\partial P}{\partial T}\right)_{V}  - P\right] \mathrm{d}V.$$	1

This is useful if the equation of state is known.

In case of an ideal gas, we can derive that $dU = C_V \, dT$, i.e. the internal energy of an ideal gas can be written as a function that depends only on the temperature.

Proof of pressure independence for an ideal gas

The expression relating changes in internal energy to changes in temperature and volume is

$$\mathrm{d}U =C_{V} \, \mathrm{d}T +\left[T\left(\frac{\partial P}{\partial T}\right)_{V}  - P\right] \mathrm{d}V.$$

The equation of state is the ideal gas law

$$P V = n R T.$$

Solve for pressure:

$$P = \frac{n R T}{V}.$$

Substitute in to internal energy expression:

$$dU =C_{V}\mathrm{d}T +\left[T\left(\frac{\partial P}{\partial T}\right)_{V}  - \frac{n R T}{V}\right]\mathrm{d}V.$$

Take the derivative of pressure with respect to temperature:

$$\left( \frac{\partial P}{\partial T} \right)_{V} = \frac{n R}{V}.$$

Replace:

$$dU = C_{V} \, \mathrm{d}T + \left[ \frac{n R T}{V}  - \frac{n R T}{V} \right] \mathrm{d}V.$$

And simplify:

$$\mathrm{d}U =C_{V} \, \mathrm{d}T.$$

Derivation of dU in terms of dT and dV

To express $\mathrm{d}U$ in terms of $\mathrm{d}T$ and $\mathrm{d}V$, the term

$$\mathrm{d}S = \left(\frac{\partial S}{\partial T}\right)_{V}\mathrm{d}T + \left(\frac{\partial S}{\partial V}\right)_{T} \mathrm{d}V$$

is substituted in the fundamental thermodynamic relation

$$\mathrm{d}U = T \, \mathrm{d}S - P \, \mathrm{d}V.$$

This gives

$$dU = T\left(\frac{\partial S}{\partial T}\right)_{V} \, dT +\left[T\left(\frac{\partial S}{\partial V}\right)_{T} - P\right] dV.$$

The term $T\left(\frac{\partial S}{\partial T}\right)_{V}$ is the heat capacity at constant volume $C_{V}.$

The partial derivative of $S$ with respect to $V$ can be evaluated if the equation of state is known. From the fundamental thermodynamic relation, it follows that the differential of the Helmholtz free energy $A$ is given by

$$dA = -S \, dT - P \, dV.$$

The symmetry of second derivatives of $A$ with respect to $T$ and $V$ yields the Maxwell relation:

$$\left(\frac{\partial S}{\partial V}\right)_{T} = \left(\frac{\partial P}{\partial T}\right)_{V}.$$

This gives the expression above.

=== Changes due to temperature and pressure ===
When considering fluids or solids, an expression in terms of the temperature and pressure is usually more useful:

$$\operatorname dU = \left(C_{P}-\alpha P V\right) \operatorname dT +\left(\beta_{T}P-\alpha T\right)V \operatorname dP,$$

where it is assumed that the heat capacity at constant pressure is related to the heat capacity at constant volume according to

$$C_{P} = C_{V} + V T\frac{\alpha^{2}}{\beta_{T}}.$$

Derivation of dU in terms of dT and dP

The partial derivative of the pressure with respect to temperature at constant volume can be expressed in terms of the coefficient of thermal expansion

$$\alpha \equiv \frac{1}{V}\left(\frac{\partial V}{\partial T}\right)_{P}$$

and the isothermal compressibility

$$\beta_{T} \equiv -\frac{1}{V}\left(\frac{\partial V}{\partial P}\right)_{T}$$

by writing

$dV = \left(\frac{\partial V}{\partial p}\right)_{T} dP + \left(\frac{\partial V}{\partial T}\right)_{P} dT = V\left(\alpha dT-\beta_{T} \, dP \right)$	2

and equating dV to zero and solving for the ratio dP/dT. This gives

$\left(\frac{\partial P}{\partial T}\right)_{V}= -\frac{\left(\frac{\partial V}{\partial T}\right)_{P}}{\left(\frac{\partial V}{\partial P}\right)_{T}}= \frac{\alpha}{\beta_{T}}.$	3

Substituting (2) and (3) in (1) gives the above expression.

=== Changes due to volume at constant temperature ===
The internal pressure is defined as a partial derivative of the internal energy with respect to the volume at constant temperature:

$$\pi _T  = \left ( \frac{\partial U}{\partial V} \right )_T.$$

== Internal energy of multi-component systems ==
In addition to including the entropy $S$ and volume $V$ terms in the internal energy, a system is often described also in terms of the number of particles or chemical species it contains:

$$U = U(S,V,N_1,\ldots,N_n),$$

where $N_j$ are the molar amounts of constituents of type $j$ in the system. The internal energy is an extensive function of the extensive variables $S$, $V$, and the amounts $N_j$, the internal energy may be written as a linearly homogeneous function of first degree:

$$U(\alpha S,\alpha V,\alpha N_{1},\alpha N_{2},\ldots )
= \alpha U(S,V,N_{1},N_{2},\ldots),$$

where $\alpha$ is a factor describing the growth of the system. The differential internal energy may be written as

$$\mathrm{d} U = \frac{\partial U}{\partial S}  \mathrm{d} S  + \frac{\partial U}{\partial V} \mathrm{d} V + \sum_i\ \frac{\partial U}{\partial N_i} \mathrm{d} N_i\ = T \,\mathrm{d} S - P \,\mathrm{d} V + \sum_i\mu_i \mathrm{d} N_i,$$

which shows (or defines) temperature $T$ to be the partial derivative of $U$ with respect to entropy $S$ and pressure $P$ to be the negative of the similar derivative with respect to volume $V$,

$$T = \frac{\partial U}{\partial S},$$
$$P = -\frac{\partial U}{\partial V},$$

and where the coefficients $\mu_{i}$ are the chemical potentials for the components of type $i$ in the system. The chemical potentials are defined as the partial derivatives of the internal energy with respect to the variations in composition:

$$\mu_i = \left( \frac{\partial U}{\partial N_i} \right)_{S,V, N_{j \ne i}}.$$

As conjugate variables to the composition $\lbrace N_{j} \rbrace$, the chemical potentials are intensive properties, intrinsically characteristic of the qualitative nature of the system, and not proportional to its extent. Under conditions of constant $T$ and $P$, because of the extensive nature of $U$ and its independent variables, using Euler's homogeneous function theorem, the differential $\mathrm d U$ may be integrated and yields an expression for the internal energy:

$$U = T S - P V + \sum_i \mu_i N_i.$$

The sum over the composition of the system is the Gibbs free energy:

$$G = \sum_i \mu_i N_i$$

that arises from changing the composition of the system at constant temperature and pressure. For a single component system, the chemical potential equals the Gibbs energy per amount of substance, i.e. particles or moles according to the original definition of the unit for $\lbrace N_{j} \rbrace$.

== Internal energy in an elastic medium ==
For an elastic medium the potential energy component of the internal energy has an elastic nature expressed in terms of the stress $\sigma_{ij}$ and strain $\varepsilon_{ij}$ involved in elastic processes. In Einstein notation for tensors, with summation over repeated indices, for unit volume, the infinitesimal statement is

$$\mathrm{d}U=T\mathrm{d}S+\sigma_{ij}\mathrm{d}\varepsilon_{ij}.$$

Euler's theorem yields for the internal energy:

$$U=TS+\frac{1}{2}\sigma_{ij}\varepsilon_{ij}.$$

For a linearly elastic material, the stress is related to the strain by

$$\sigma_{ij}=C_{ijkl} \varepsilon_{kl},$$

where the $C_{ijkl}$ are the components of the 4th-rank elastic constant tensor of the medium.

Elastic deformations, such as sound, passing through a body, or other forms of macroscopic internal agitation or turbulent motion create states when the system is not in thermodynamic equilibrium. While such energies of motion continue, they contribute to the total energy of the system; thermodynamic internal energy pertains only when such motions have ceased.

== History ==
James Joule studied the relationship between heat, work, and temperature. He observed that friction in a liquid, such as caused by its agitation with work by a paddle wheel, caused an increase in its temperature, which he described as producing a quantity of heat. Expressed in modern units, he found that about 4186 joules of energy were needed to raise the temperature of one kilogram of water by one degree Celsius.

== See also ==
- Calorimetry
- Enthalpy
- Exergy
- Thermodynamic equations
- Thermodynamic potentials
- Gibbs free energy
- Helmholtz free energy

== Bibliography ==
- Alberty, R. A. (2001). "Use of Legendre transforms in chemical thermodynamics" (PDF). Pure Appl. Chem. 73 (8): 1349–1380. doi:10.1351/pac200173081349. S2CID 98264934.
- Lewis, Gilbert Newton; Randall, Merle: Revised by Pitzer, Kenneth S. & Brewer, Leo (1961). Thermodynamics (2nd ed.). New York, NY USA: McGraw-Hill Book Co. ISBN 978-0-07-113809-3.
