= Work (electric field) =

Energy transfer by a charged particle

Electric field work is the work performed by an electric field on a charged particle in its vicinity. The work per unit of charge is defined as the movement of negligible test charge between two points, and is expressed as the difference in electric potential at those points. The work can be done, for example, by generators, (electrochemical cells) or thermocouples generating an electromotive force.

Electric field work is formally equivalent to work by other force fields in physics, and the mathematical frame for electrical work is identical to that of mechanical work.

== Physical process ==
Particles that are free to move, if positively charged, normally tend towards regions of lower electric potential (net negative charge), while negatively charged particles tend to shift towards regions of higher potential (net positive charge).

Any movement of a positive charge into a region of higher potential requires external work to be done against the electric field, which is equal to the work that the electric field would do in moving that positive charge the same distance in the opposite direction. Similarly, it requires positive external work to transfer a negatively charged particle from a region of higher potential to a region of lower potential.

Kirchhoff's voltage law, one of the most fundamental laws governing electrical and electronic circuits, tells us that the voltage gains and the drops in any electrical circuit always sum to zero.

The formalism for electric work has an equivalent format to that of mechanical work. The work per unit of charge, when moving a negligible test charge between two points, is defined as the voltage between those points.

$$W = Q \int_{a}^{b} \mathbf{E} \cdot \, d \mathbf{r} = Q \int_{a}^{b} \frac{\mathbf{F_E}}{Q} \cdot \, d \mathbf{r}= \int_{a}^{b} \mathbf{F_E} \cdot \, d \mathbf{r}$$

where

Q is the electric charge of the particle
E is the electric field, which at a location is the force at that location divided by a unit ('test') charge
F_{E} is the Coulomb (electric) force
r is the displacement
$\cdot$ is the dot product operator

== Mathematical description ==
Given a charged object in empty space, Q+. To move q+ closer to Q+ (starting from $r_0 = \infty$, where the potential energy=0, for convenience), we would have to apply an external force against the Coulomb field and positive work would be performed. Mathematically, using the definition of a conservative force, we know that we can relate this force to a potential energy gradient as:

$$\frac{\partial U}{\partial \mathbf{r}} = \mathbf{F}_{ext}$$

Where U(r) is the potential energy of q+ at a distance r from the source Q. So, integrating and using Coulomb's law for the force:

$$U(r) = \Delta U = \int_{r_0}^{r} \mathbf{F}_{ext} \cdot \, d \mathbf{r}= \int_{r_0}^{r} \frac{1}{4\pi\varepsilon_0}\frac{q_1q_2}{\mathbf{r^2}} \cdot \, d \mathbf{r}= - \frac{q_1q_2}{4\pi\varepsilon_0}\left(\frac{1}{r_0}- \frac{1}{r}\right) = \frac{q_1q_2}{4\pi\varepsilon_0} \frac{1}{r}$$

Where $\epsilon_0$=Vacuum permittivity

Now, use the relationship

$$W = -\Delta U \!$$

To show that the external work done to move a point charge q+ from infinity to a distance r is:

$$W_{ext} = \frac{q_1q_2}{4\pi\varepsilon_0}\frac{1}{r}$$

This could have been obtained equally by using the definition of W and integrating F with respect to r, which will prove the above relationship.

In the example both charges are positive; this equation is applicable to any charge configuration (as the product of the charges will be either positive or negative according to their (dis)similarity). If one of the charges were to be negative in the earlier example, the work taken to wrench that charge away to infinity would be exactly the same as the work needed in the earlier example to push that charge back to that same position. This is easy to see mathematically, as reversing the boundaries of integration reverses the sign.

=== Uniform electric field ===
Where the electric field is constant (i.e. not a function of displacement, r), the work equation simplifies to:

$$W =
Q (\mathbf{E} \cdot \, \mathbf{r})=\mathbf{F_E} \cdot \, \mathbf{r}$$

or 'force times distance' (times the cosine of the angle between them).

== Electric power ==
The electric power is the rate of energy transferred in an electric circuit. As a partial derivative, it is expressed as the change of work over time:

$$P=\frac{\partial W}{\partial t}=\frac{\partial QV}{\partial t}$$,

where V is the voltage. Work is defined by:

$$\delta W = \mathbf{F}\cdot\mathbf{v}\delta t,$$

Therefore

$$\frac{\partial W}{\partial t}=\mathbf{F_E} \cdot \,\mathbf{v}$$
