= State postulate =

The state postulate is a term used in thermodynamics that defines the given number of properties to a thermodynamic system in a state of equilibrium. It is also sometimes referred to as the state principle. The state postulate allows a finite number of properties to be specified in order to fully describe a state of thermodynamic equilibrium. Once the state postulate is given the other unspecified properties must assume certain values.

The state postulate says:

The state of a simple compressible system is completely specified by two independent, intensive properties

A more general statement of the state postulate says:

the state of a simple system is completely specified by r+1 independent, intensive properties where r is the number of significant work interactions.

Two intensive variables are sufficient to derive all the others by use of an equation of state. Three are used for more complex systems in order to solve for the complete state. In a multiphase system (such as a mixture of gas and liquid) this is not the case. (e.g., boiling point (temperature) depends on elevation (ambient pressure)).

In addition, while the state postulate defines how many independent properties are required to completely define a state, it does not necessarily guarantee that such a state will be unique. For example, for single-phase water near 4 °C, a given density and pressure pair can actually correspond to two different liquid states with two different temperatures. However, for a simple compressible system, certain pairs of intensive properties are guaranteed to define a unique state provided that they are independent (e.g. temperature and density, or temperature and pressure).

== See also ==
- Gibbs' phase rule
