= Ehrenfest =

Ehrenfest is a surname. Notable people with the surname include:

- Paul Ehrenfest (1880-1933), Austrian physicist and mathematician
  - Ehrenfest equations
  - Ehrenfest model
  - Ehrenfest paradox
  - Ehrenfest theorem
  - 32796 Ehrenfest
- Tatjana Ehrenfest-Afanassjewa (1876-1964), Ukrainian-Russian mathematician, wife of Paul
- Tanja van Aardenne-Ehrenfest (1905–1984), Austrian Dutch mathematician, daughter of Paul

== See also ==
- Ehrenfeld (disambiguation)
- Ehrenfels (disambiguation)
- Ehrenbaum
- Ehrenberg (disambiguation)
- Ehrenburg (disambiguation)
- Ehrenhaft
- Ehrenpreis
- Ehrenstein
- Ehrenthal
