= Table of thermodynamic equations =

Common thermodynamic equations and quantities in thermodynamics, using mathematical notation, are as follows:

== Definitions ==
Many of the definitions below are also used in the thermodynamics of chemical reactions.

=== General basic quantities ===
Quantity (common name/s)	(Common) symbol/s	SI unit	Dimension
Number of molecules	N	1	1
Amount of substance	n	mol	N
Temperature	T	K	Θ
Heat Energy	Q, q	J	ML^{2}T^{−2}
Latent heat	Q_{L}	J	ML^{2}T^{−2}

=== General derived quantities ===
Quantity (common name/s)	(Common) symbol/s	Defining equation	SI unit	Dimension
Thermodynamic beta, inverse temperature	β	$\beta = 1/k_\text{B} T$	J^{−1}	T^{2}M^{−1}L^{−2}
Thermodynamic temperature	τ	$\tau = k_\text{B} T$ $\tau = k_\text{B} \left (\partial U/\partial S \right )_{N}$ $1/\tau = 1/k_\text{B} \left (\partial S/\partial U \right )_{N}$	J	ML^{2}T^{−2}
Entropy	S	$S = -k_\text{B}\sum_i p_i\ln p_i$ $S = -\left (\partial F/\partial T \right )_{V,N}$ , $S = -\left (\partial G/\partial T \right )_{P,N}$	J⋅K^{−1}	ML^{2}T^{−2}Θ^{−1}
Pressure	P	$P = - \left (\partial F/\partial V \right )_{T,N}$ $P = - \left (\partial U/\partial V \right )_{S,N}$	Pa	ML^{−1}T^{−2}
Internal Energy	U	$U = \sum_i p_i E_i$	J	ML^{2}T^{−2}
Enthalpy	H	$H = U+pV$	J	ML^{2}T^{−2}
Partition Function	Z		1	1
Gibbs free energy	G	$G = H - TS$	J	ML^{2}T^{−2}
Chemical potential (of component i in a mixture)	μ_{i}	$\mu_i = \left (\partial U/\partial N_i \right )_{N_{j \neq i}, S, V }$ $\mu_i = \left (\partial F/\partial N_i \right )_{T, V }$, where $F$ is not proportional to $N$ because $\mu_i$ depends on pressure. $\mu_i = \left (\partial G/\partial N_i \right )_{T, P }$, where $G$ is proportional to $N$ (as long as the molar ratio composition of the system remains the same) because $\mu_i$ depends only on temperature and pressure and composition. $\mu_i/\tau = -1/k_\text{B} \left (\partial S/\partial N_i \right )_{U,V}$	J	ML^{2}T^{−2}
Helmholtz free energy	A, F	$F = U - TS$	J	ML^{2}T^{−2}
Landau potential, Landau free energy, Grand potential	Ω, Φ_{G}	$\Omega = U - TS - \mu N\$	J	ML^{2}T^{−2}
Massieu potential, Helmholtz free entropy	Φ	$\Phi = S - U/T$	J⋅K^{−1}	ML^{2}T^{−2}Θ^{−1}
Planck potential, Gibbs free entropy	Ξ	$\Xi = \Phi - pV/T$	J⋅K^{−1}	ML^{2}T^{−2}Θ^{−1}

=== Thermal properties of matter ===
Quantity (common name/s)	(Common) symbol/s	Defining equation	SI unit	Dimension
General heat/thermal capacity	C	$C = \partial Q/\partial T$	J⋅K^{−1}	ML^{2}T^{−2}Θ^{−1}
Heat capacity (isobaric)	C_{p}	$C_{p} = \partial H/\partial T$	J⋅K^{−1}	ML^{2}T^{−2}Θ^{−1}
Specific heat capacity (isobaric)	C_{mp}	$C_{mp} = \partial^2 Q/\partial m \partial T$	J⋅kg^{−1}⋅K^{−1}	L^{2}T^{−2}Θ^{−1}
Molar specific heat capacity (isobaric)	C_{np}	$C_{np} = \partial^2 Q/\partial n \partial T$	J⋅K^{−1}⋅mol^{−1}	ML^{2}T^{−2}Θ^{−1}N^{−1}
Heat capacity (isochoric/volumetric)	C_{V}	$C_{V} = \partial U/\partial T$	J⋅K^{−1}	ML^{2}T^{−2}Θ^{−1}
Specific heat capacity (isochoric)	C_{mV}	$C_{mV} = \partial^2 Q/\partial m \partial T$	J⋅kg^{−1}⋅K^{−1}	L^{2}T^{−2}Θ^{−1}
Molar specific heat capacity (isochoric)	C_{nV}	$C_{nV} = \partial^2 Q/\partial n \partial T$	J⋅K⋅^{−1} mol^{−1}	ML^{2}T^{−2}Θ^{−1}N^{−1}
Specific latent heat	L	$L = \partial Q/ \partial m$	J⋅kg^{−1}	L^{2}T^{−2}
Ratio of isobaric to isochoric heat capacity, heat capacity ratio, adiabatic index, Laplace coefficient	γ	$\gamma = C_p/C_V = c_p/c_V = C_{mp}/C_{mV}$	1	1

=== Thermal transfer ===
Quantity (common name/s)	(Common) symbol/s	Defining equation	SI unit	Dimension
Temperature gradient	No standard symbol	$\nabla T$	K⋅m^{−1}	ΘL^{−1}
Thermal conduction rate, thermal current, thermal/heat flux, thermal power transfer	P	$P = \mathrm{d} Q/\mathrm{d} t$	W	ML^{2}T^{−3}
Thermal intensity	I	$I = \mathrm{d} P/\mathrm{d} A$	W⋅m^{−2}	MT^{−3}
Thermal/heat flux density (vector analogue of thermal intensity above)	q	$Q = \iint \mathbf{q} \cdot \mathrm{d}\mathbf{S}\mathrm{d} t$	W⋅m^{−2}	MT^{−3}

== Equations ==
The equations in this article are classified by subject.

=== Thermodynamic processes ===
Physical situation	Equations
Isentropic process (adiabatic and reversible)	$Q = 0, \quad \Delta U = -W$ For an ideal gas $p_1 V_1^{\gamma} = p_2 V_2^{\gamma}$ $T_1 V_1^{\gamma - 1} = T_2 V_2^{\gamma - 1}$ $p_1^{1-\gamma} T_1^{\gamma} = p_2^{1 - \gamma} T_2^{\gamma}$
Isothermal process	$\Delta U = 0, \quad W = Q$ For an ideal gas $W=kTN \ln(V_2/V_1)$ $W=nRT \ln(V_2/V_1)$
Isobaric process	p_{1} = p_{2}, p = constant $W = p \Delta V, \quad Q = \Delta U + p \delta V$
Isochoric process	V_{1} = V_{2}, V = constant $W = 0, \quad Q = \Delta U$
Free expansion	$\Delta U = 0$
Work done by an expanding gas	Process $W = \int_{V_1}^{V_2} p \mathrm{d}V$ Net work done in cyclic processes $W = \oint_\mathrm{cycle} p \mathrm{d}V = \oint_\mathrm{cycle}\Delta Q$

=== Kinetic theory ===
Ideal gas equations
Physical situation	Nomenclature	Equations
Ideal gas law	p = pressure; V = volume of container; T = temperature; n = amount of substance; R = gas constant; N = number of molecules; k = Boltzmann constant	$pV = nRT = kTN$ $\frac{p_1 V_1}{p_2 V_2} = \frac{n_1 T_1}{n_2 T_2} = \frac{N_1 T_1}{N_2 T_2}$
Pressure of an ideal gas	m = mass of one molecule; M_{m} = molar mass	$p = \frac{Nm \langle v^2 \rangle}{3V} = \frac{nM_m \langle v^2 \rangle}{3V} = \frac{1}{3}\rho \langle v^2 \rangle$

==== Ideal gas ====
Quantity	General Equation	Isobaric Δp = 0	Isochoric ΔV = 0	Isothermal ΔT = 0	Adiabatic $Q=0$
Work W	$\Delta W = -p dV\;$	$-p\Delta V\;$	$0\;$	$-nRT\ln\frac{V_2}{V_1}\;$ $-nRT\ln\frac{P_1}{P_2}\;$	$\frac{PV^\gamma (V_f^{1-\gamma} - V_i^{1-\gamma}) } {1-\gamma} = C_V \left(T_2 - T_1 \right)$
Heat Capacity C	(as for real gas)	$C_p = \frac{5}{2}nR$ (for monatomic ideal gas) $C_p = \frac{7}{2}nR$ (for diatomic ideal gas)	$C_V = \frac{3}{2}nR$ (for monatomic ideal gas) $C_V = \frac{5}{2}nR \;$ (for diatomic ideal gas)		
Internal Energy ΔU	$\Delta U = C_V \Delta T\;$	$Q + W\;$ $Q_p - p\Delta V$	$Q\;$ $C_V\left ( T_2-T_1 \right )$	$0\;$ $Q=-W$	$W\;$ $C_V\left ( T_2-T_1 \right )$
Enthalpy ΔH	$H=U+pV\;$	$C_p\left ( T_2-T_1 \right )\;$	$Q_V+V\Delta p\;$	$0\;$	$C_p\left ( T_2-T_1 \right )\;$
Entropy Δs	$\Delta S = C_V \ln{T_2 \over T_1} + nR \ln{V_2 \over V_1}$ $\Delta S = C_p \ln{T_2 \over T_1} - nR \ln{p_2 \over p_1}$	$C_p\ln\frac{T_2}{T_1}\;$	$C_V\ln\frac{T_2}{T_1}\;$	$nR\ln\frac{V_2}{V_1}\;$ $\frac{Q}{T}\;$	$C_p\ln\frac{V_2}{V_1}+C_V\ln\frac{p_2}{p_1}=0\;$
Constant	$\;$	$\frac{V}{T}\;$	$\frac{p}{T}\;$	$p V\;$	$p V^\gamma\;$

=== Entropy ===
- $S = k_\mathrm{B} \ln \Omega$, where k_{B} is the Boltzmann constant, and Ω denotes the volume of macrostate in the phase space or otherwise called thermodynamic probability.
- $dS = \frac{\delta Q}{T}$, for reversible processes only

=== Statistical physics ===
Below are useful results from the Maxwell–Boltzmann distribution for an ideal gas, and the implications of the Entropy quantity. The distribution is valid for atoms or molecules constituting ideal gases.

Physical situation	Nomenclature	Equations
Maxwell–Boltzmann distribution	v = velocity of atom/molecule, m = mass of each molecule (all molecules are identical in kinetic theory), γ(p) = Lorentz factor as function of momentum (see below); Ratio of thermal to rest mass-energy of each molecule: $\theta = k_\text{B} T/mc^2$; K_{2} is the modified Bessel function of the second kind.	Non-relativistic speeds $P\left ( v \right )=4\pi\left ( \frac{m}{2\pi k_\text{B} T} \right )^{3/2} v^2 e^{-mv^2/2 k_\text{B} T}$ Relativistic speeds (Maxwell–Jüttner distribution) $f(p) = \frac{1}{4 \pi m^3 c^3 \theta K_2(1/\theta)} e^{-\gamma(p)/\theta}$
Entropy Logarithm of the density of states	P_{i} = probability of system in microstate i; Ω = total number of microstates	$S = - k_\text{B}\sum_i P_i \ln P_i = k_\mathrm{B}\ln \Omega$ where: $P_i = 1/\Omega$
Entropy change		$\Delta S = \int_{Q_1}^{Q_2} \frac{\mathrm{d}Q}{T}$ $\Delta S = k_\text{B} N \ln\frac{V_2}{V_1} + N C_V \ln\frac{T_2}{T_1}$
Entropic force		$\mathbf{F}_\mathrm{S} = -T \nabla S$
Equipartition theorem	d_{f} = degree of freedom	Average kinetic energy per degree of freedom $\langle E_\mathrm{k} \rangle = \frac{1}{2}kT$ Internal energy $U = d_\text{f} \langle E_\mathrm{k} \rangle = \frac{d_\text{f}}{2}kT$

Corollaries of the non-relativistic Maxwell–Boltzmann distribution are below.

Physical situation	Nomenclature	Equations
Mean speed		$\langle v \rangle = \sqrt{\frac{8 k_\text{B} T}{\pi m}}$
Root mean square speed		$v_\mathrm{rms} = \sqrt{\langle v^2 \rangle} = \sqrt{\frac{3 k_\text{B} T}{m}}$
Modal speed		$v_\mathrm{mode} = \sqrt{\frac{2 k_\text{B} T}{m}}$
Mean free path	σ = effective cross-section; n = volume density of number of target particles; ℓ = mean free path	$\ell = 1/\sqrt{2} n \sigma$

=== Quasi-static and reversible processes ===
For quasi-static and reversible processes, the first law of thermodynamics is:

$$dU=\delta Q - \delta W$$

where δQ is the heat supplied to the system and δW is the work done by the system.

=== Thermodynamic potentials ===
The following energies are called the thermodynamic potentials,

Name	Symbol	Formula	Natural variables
Internal energy	$U$	$\int \left( T \, \mathrm{d}S - p \, \mathrm{d}V + \sum_i \mu_i \mathrm{d}N_i \right)$	$S, V, \{N_i\}$
Helmholtz free energy	$A$	$U - TS$	$T, V, \{N_i\}$
Enthalpy	$H$	$U + pV$	$S, p, \{N_i\}$
Gibbs free energy	$G$	$U + pV - TS$	$T, p, \{N_i\}$
Landau potential, or grand potential	$\Omega$, $\Phi_\text{G}$	$U - T S -$$\sum_i\,$$\mu_i N_i$	$T, V, \{\mu_i\}$

and the corresponding fundamental thermodynamic relations or "master equations" are:

Potential	Differential
Internal energy	$dU\left(S,V,{N_{i}}\right) = TdS - pdV + \sum_{i} \mu_{i} dN_i$
Enthalpy	$dH\left(S,p,{N_{i}}\right) = TdS + Vdp + \sum_{i} \mu_{i} dN_{i}$
Helmholtz free energy	$dA\left(T,V,{N_{i}}\right) = -SdT - pdV + \sum_{i} \mu_{i} dN_{i}$
Gibbs free energy	$dG\left(T,p,{N_{i}}\right) = -SdT + Vdp + \sum_{i} \mu_{i} dN_{i}$

=== Maxwell's relations ===
The four most common Maxwell's relations are:

Physical situation	Nomenclature	Equations
Thermodynamic potentials as functions of their natural variables	$U(S,V)\,$ = Internal energy; $H(S,p)\,$ = Enthalpy; $A(T,V)\,$ = Helmholtz free energy; $G(T,p)\,$ = Gibbs free energy	$\left(\frac{\partial T}{\partial V}\right)_S = -\left(\frac{\partial p}{\partial S}\right)_V = \frac{\partial^2 U }{\partial S \partial V}$ $\left(\frac{\partial T}{\partial p}\right)_S = +\left(\frac{\partial V}{\partial S}\right)_p = \frac{\partial^2 H }{\partial S \partial p}$ $+\left(\frac{\partial S}{\partial V}\right)_T = \left(\frac{\partial p}{\partial T}\right)_V = - \frac{\partial^2 A }{\partial T \partial V}$ $-\left(\frac{\partial S}{\partial p}\right)_T = \left(\frac{\partial V}{\partial T}\right)_p = \frac{\partial^2 G }{\partial T \partial p}$

More relations include the following.

$\left ( {\partial S\over \partial U} \right )_{V,N} = { 1\over T }$	$\left ( {\partial S\over \partial V} \right )_{N,U} = { p\over T }$	$\left ( {\partial S\over \partial N} \right )_{V,U} = - { \mu \over T }$
$\left ( {\partial T\over \partial S} \right )_V = { T \over C_V }$	$\left ( {\partial T\over \partial S} \right )_p = { T \over C_p }$	
$-\left ( {\partial p\over \partial V} \right )_T = { 1 \over {VK_T} }$		

Other differential equations are:

Name	H	U	G
Gibbs–Helmholtz equation	$H = -T^2\left(\frac{\partial \left(G/T\right)}{\partial T}\right)_p$	$U = -T^2\left(\frac{\partial \left(A/T\right)}{\partial T}\right)_V$	$G = -V^2\left(\frac{\partial \left(A/V\right)}{\partial V}\right)_T$
	$\left(\frac{\partial H}{\partial p}\right)_T = V - T\left(\frac{\partial V}{\partial T}\right)_p$	$\left(\frac{\partial U}{\partial V}\right)_T = T\left(\frac{\partial p}{\partial T}\right)_V - p$	

=== Quantum properties ===
- $U = N k_\text{B} T^2 \left(\frac{\partial \ln Z}{\partial T}\right)_V$
- $S = \frac{U}{T} + N k_\text{B} \ln Z - N k \ln N + Nk$ Indistinguishable Particles

where N is number of particles, h is that Planck constant, I is moment of inertia, and Z is the partition function, in various forms:

Degree of freedom	Partition function
Translation	$Z_t = \frac{(2 \pi m k_\text{B} T)^\frac{3}{2} V}{h^3}$
Vibration	$Z_v = \frac{1}{1 - e^\frac{-h \omega}{2 \pi k_\text{B} T}}$
Rotation	$Z_r = \frac{2 I k_\text{B} T}{\sigma (\frac{h}{2 \pi})^2}$: where: σ = 1 (heteronuclear molecules); σ = 2 (homonuclear)

== Thermal properties of matter ==
Coefficients	Equation
Joule-Thomson coefficient	$\mu_{JT} = \left(\frac{\partial T}{\partial p}\right)_H$
Compressibility (constant temperature)	$K_T = -{ 1\over V } \left ( {\partial V\over \partial p} \right )_{T,N}$
Coefficient of thermal expansion (constant pressure)	$\alpha_{p} = \frac{1}{V}\left(\frac{\partial V}{\partial T}\right)_p$
Heat capacity (constant pressure)	$C_p = \left ( {\partial Q_{rev} \over \partial T} \right )_p = \left ( {\partial U \over \partial T} \right )_p + p \left ( {\partial V \over \partial T} \right )_p = \left ( {\partial H \over \partial T} \right )_p = T \left ( {\partial S \over \partial T} \right )_p$
Heat capacity (constant volume)	$C_V = \left ( {\partial Q_{rev} \over \partial T} \right )_V = \left ( {\partial U \over \partial T} \right )_V = T \left ( {\partial S \over \partial T} \right )_V$

Derivation of heat capacity (constant pressure)

Since

$$\left(\frac{\partial T}{\partial p}\right)_H
\left(\frac{\partial p}{\partial H}\right)_T
\left(\frac{\partial H}{\partial T}\right)_p
= -1$$
$$\begin{align}
\left(\frac{\partial T}{\partial p}\right)_H
& = -\left(\frac{\partial H}{\partial p}\right)_T
\left(\frac{\partial T}{\partial H}\right)_p
\\
& = \frac{-1}{\left(\frac{\partial H}{\partial T}\right)_p}
\left(\frac{\partial H}{\partial p}\right)_T
\end{align}$$
$$C_p = \left(\frac{\partial H}{\partial T}\right)_p$$
$$\Rightarrow \left(\frac{\partial T}{\partial p}\right)_H
= -\frac{1}{C_p}
\left(\frac{\partial H}{\partial p}\right)_T$$

Derivation of heat capacity (constant volume)

Since

$$dU = \delta Q_{rev} - \delta W_{rev} ,$$

(where δW_{rev} is the work done by the system),

$$\delta S = \frac{\delta Q_{rev}}{T}, \delta W_{rev}= p \delta V$$
$$d U = T \delta S- p\delta V$$
$$\left(\frac{\partial U}{\partial T}\right)_V
= T\left(\frac{\partial S}{\partial T}\right)_V
- p\left(\frac{\partial V}{\partial T}\right)_V ; C_V = \left(\frac{\partial U}{\partial T}\right)_V$$
$$\Rightarrow C_V = T\left(\frac{\partial S}{\partial T}\right)_V$$

=== Thermal transfer ===
Physical situation	Nomenclature	Equations
Net intensity emission/absorption	T_{external} = external temperature (outside of system); T_{system} = internal temperature (inside system); ε = emissivity	$I = \sigma \epsilon \left ( T_\mathrm{external}^4 - T_\mathrm{system}^4 \right )$
Internal energy of a substance	C_{V} = isovolumetric heat capacity of substance; ΔT = temperature change of substance	$\Delta U = N C_V \Delta T$
Meyer's equation	C_{p} = isobaric heat capacity; C_{V} = isovolumetric heat capacity; n = amount of substance	$C_p - C_V = nR$
Effective thermal conductivities	λ_{i} = thermal conductivity of substance i; λ_{net} = equivalent thermal conductivity	Series $\lambda_\mathrm{net} = \sum_j \lambda_j$ Parallel $\frac{1}{\lambda}_\mathrm{net} = \sum_j \left ( \frac{1}{\lambda}_j \right )$

=== Thermal efficiencies ===
Physical situation	Nomenclature	Equations
Thermodynamic engines	η = efficiency; W = work done by engine; Q_{H} = heat energy in higher temperature reservoir; Q_{L} = heat energy in lower temperature reservoir; T_{H} = temperature of higher temp. reservoir; T_{L} = temperature of lower temp. reservoir	Thermodynamic engine: $\eta = \left |\frac{W}{Q_\text{H}} \right|$ Carnot engine efficiency: $\eta_\text{c} = 1 - \left | \frac{Q_\text{L}}{Q_\text{H}} \right | = 1-\frac{T_\text{L}}{T_\text{H}}$
Refrigeration	K = coefficient of refrigeration performance	Refrigeration performance $K = \left | \frac{Q_\text{L}}{W} \right |$ Carnot refrigeration performance $K_\text{C} = \frac{|Q_\text{L}|}{|Q_\text{H}|-|Q_\text{L}|} = \frac{T_\text{L}}{T_\text{H}-T_\text{L}}$

== See also ==
- List of thermodynamic properties
- Antoine equation
- Bejan number
- Bowen ratio
- Bridgman's equations
- Clausius–Clapeyron relation
- Departure functions
- Duhem–Margules equation
- Ehrenfest equations
- Gibbs–Helmholtz equation
- Phase rule
- Kopp's law
- Noro–Frenkel law of corresponding states
- Onsager reciprocal relations
- Stefan number
- Thermodynamics
- Timeline of thermodynamics
- Triple product rule
- Exact differential
