= Ehrenfels =

Ehrenfels may refer to:

== People ==
- Christian von Ehrenfels (1859-1932), an Austrian philosopher
- Baron Omar Rolf von Ehrenfels (1901-1980), an Austrian anthropologist and orientalist

== Places ==
- Ehrenfels Castle (disambiguation)
- Burg Kammerstein (Ehrenfels), a castle in Styria, Austria

== Things ==
- Ehrenfelser, a white wine grape variety
