= Victor Ehrenberg =

Victor Ehrenberg is the name of:

- Victor Ehrenberg (jurist) (1851–1929)
- Victor Ehrenberg (historian) (1891–1976)

== See also ==
- Ehrenberg (disambiguation)
