= Ehrenburg =

Ehrenburg may refer to:

== Castles and palaces ==
- Ehrenburg Palace, Bavaria, Germany
- Ehrenburg (Brodenbach), Rhineland-Palatinate, Germany
- Ehrenburg (Plaue), Thuringia, Germany

== Places ==
- Ehrenburg, Arizona
- Ehrenburg, Lower Saxony, a municipality in the district of Diepholz, Lower Saxony, Germany

== People ==
- Ilya Ehrenburg (1891–1967), Soviet poet, translator, and writer

== Other uses ==
- Ehrenbürg, a hill in Bavaria, Germany

== See also ==
- Ehrenberg (disambiguation)
