= Bridgman's thermodynamic equations =

In thermodynamics, Bridgman's thermodynamic equations are a basic set of thermodynamic equations, derived using a method of generating multiple thermodynamic identities involving a number of thermodynamic quantities. The equations are named after the American physicist Percy Williams Bridgman. (See also the exact differential article for general differential relationships).

The extensive variables of the system are fundamental. Only the entropy S , the volume V and the four most common thermodynamic potentials will be considered. The four most common thermodynamic potentials are:

Internal energy	U
Enthalpy	H
Helmholtz free energy	A
Gibbs free energy	G

The first derivatives of the internal energy with respect to its (extensive) natural variables S and V yields the intensive parameters of the system - The pressure P and the temperature T . For a simple system in which the particle numbers are constant, the second derivatives of the thermodynamic potentials can all be expressed in terms of only three material properties

heat capacity (constant pressure)	C_{P}
Coefficient of thermal expansion	α
Isothermal compressibility	β_{T}

Bridgman's equations are a series of relationships between all of the above quantities.

== Introduction ==
Many thermodynamic equations are expressed in terms of partial derivatives. For example, the expression for the heat capacity at constant pressure is:

$$C_P=\left(\frac{\partial H}{\partial T}\right)_P$$

which is the partial derivative of the enthalpy with respect to temperature while holding pressure constant. We may write this equation as:

$$C_P=\frac{(\partial H)_P}{(\partial T)_P}$$

This method of rewriting the partial derivative was described by Bridgman (and also Lewis & Randall), and allows the use of the following collection of expressions to express many thermodynamic equations. For example from the equations below we have:

$$(\partial H)_P=C_P$$

and

$$(\partial T)_P=1$$

Dividing, we recover the proper expression for C_{P}.

The following summary restates various partial terms in terms of the thermodynamic potentials, the state parameters S, T, P, V, and the following three material properties which are easily measured experimentally.

$$\left(\frac{\partial V}{\partial T}\right)_P = \alpha V$$
$$\left(\frac{\partial V}{\partial P}\right)_T = -\beta_T V$$
$$\left(\frac{\partial H}{\partial T}\right)_P = C_P = c_P N$$

== Bridgman's thermodynamic equations ==
Note that Lewis and Randall use F and E for the Gibbs energy and internal energy, respectively, rather than G and U which are used in this article.

$$(\partial T)_P=-(\partial P)_T=1$$

$$(\partial V)_P=-(\partial P)_V=\left(\frac{\partial V}{\partial T}\right)_P$$

$$(\partial S)_P=-(\partial P)_S=\frac{C_p}{T}$$

$$(\partial U)_P=-(\partial P)_U=C_P-P\left(\frac{\partial V}{\partial T}\right)_P$$

$$(\partial H)_P=-(\partial P)_H=C_P$$

$$(\partial G)_P=-(\partial P)_G=-S$$

$$(\partial A)_P=-(\partial P)_A=-S-P\left(\frac{\partial V}{\partial T}\right)_P$$

$$(\partial V)_T=-(\partial T)_V=-\left(\frac{\partial V}{\partial P}\right)_T$$

$$(\partial S)_T=-(\partial T)_S=\left(\frac{\partial V}{\partial T}\right)_P$$

$$(\partial U)_T=-(\partial T)_U=T\left(\frac{\partial V}{\partial T}\right)_P+P\left(\frac{\partial V}{\partial P}\right)_T$$

$$(\partial H)_T=-(\partial T)_H=-V+T\left(\frac{\partial V}{\partial T}\right)_P$$

$$(\partial G)_T=-(\partial T)_G=-V$$

$$(\partial A)_T=-(\partial T)_A=P\left(\frac{\partial V}{\partial P}\right)_T$$

$$(\partial S)_V=-(\partial V)_S=\frac{C_P}{T}\left(\frac{\partial V}{\partial P}\right)_T+\left(\frac{\partial V}{\partial T}\right)_P^2$$

$$(\partial U)_V=-(\partial V)_U=C_P\left(\frac{\partial V}{\partial P}\right)_T+T\left(\frac{\partial V}{\partial T}\right)_P^2$$

$$(\partial H)_V=-(\partial V)_H=C_P\left(\frac{\partial V}{\partial P}\right)_T+T\left(\frac{\partial V}{\partial T}\right)_P^2-V\left(\frac{\partial V}{\partial T}\right)_P$$

$$(\partial G)_V=-(\partial V)_G=-V\left(\frac{\partial V}{\partial T}\right)_P-S\left(\frac{\partial V}{\partial P}\right)_T$$

$$(\partial A)_V=-(\partial V)_A=-S\left(\frac{\partial V}{\partial P}\right)_T$$

$$(\partial U)_S=-(\partial S)_U=\frac{PC_P}{T}\left(\frac{\partial V}{\partial P}\right)_T+P\left(\frac{\partial V}{\partial T}\right)_P^2$$

$$(\partial H)_S=-(\partial S)_H=-\frac{VC_P}{T}$$

$$(\partial G)_S=-(\partial S)_G=-\frac{VC_P}{T}+S\left(\frac{\partial V}{\partial T}\right)_P$$

$$(\partial A)_S=-(\partial S)_A=\frac{PC_P}{T}\left(\frac{\partial V}{\partial P}\right)_T+P\left(\frac{\partial V}{\partial T}\right)_P^2+S\left(\frac{\partial V}{\partial T}\right)_P$$

$$(\partial H)_U=-(\partial U)_H=-VC_P+PV\left(\frac{\partial V}{\partial T}\right)_P-PC_P\left(\frac{\partial V}{\partial P}\right)_T-PT\left(\frac{\partial V}{\partial T}\right)_P^2$$

$$(\partial G)_U=-(\partial U)_G=-VC_P+PV\left(\frac{\partial V}{\partial T}\right)_P+ST\left(\frac{\partial V}{\partial T}\right)_P+SP\left(\frac{\partial V}{\partial P}\right)_T$$

$$(\partial A)_U=-(\partial U)_A=P(C_P+S)\left(\frac{\partial V}{\partial P}\right)_T+PT\left(\frac{\partial V}{\partial T}\right)_P^2+ST\left(\frac{\partial V}{\partial T}\right)_P$$

$$(\partial G)_H=-(\partial H)_G=-V(C_P+S)+TS\left(\frac{\partial V}{\partial T}\right)_P$$

$$(\partial A)_H=-(\partial H)_A=-\left[S+P\left(\frac{\partial V}{\partial T}\right)_P\right]\left[V-T\left(\frac{\partial V}{\partial T}\right)_P\right]+PC_P\left(\frac{\partial V}{\partial P}\right)_T$$

$$(\partial A)_G=-(\partial G)_A=-S\left[V+P\left(\frac{\partial V}{\partial P}\right)_T\right]-PV\left(\frac{\partial V}{\partial T}\right)_P$$

== See also ==
- Table of thermodynamic equations
- Exact differential
