= Ehrenfeld =

Ehrenfeld is "field of honor" in German. Ehrenfeld may refer to:

- Ehrenfeld, Pennsylvania
- Ehrenfeld, Cologne, borough of the city of Cologne, Germany
- Ehrenfeld Group, an anti-Nazi resistance group centered in Cologne
- Ehrenfeld (surname)
