= Ehrenberg =

Ehrenberg may refer to:

== Places ==
=== Germany ===
- Ehrenberg, Hesse, a municipality in the Fulda district
- Ehrenberg, Thuringia, a municipality in the Hildburghausen district
- Ehrenberg (Ilmenau), a hill in Thuringia
- Burg Ehrenberg, a castle on the River Neckar, Baden-Württemberg

=== Elsewhere ===
- Ehrenberg Castle, near Reutte in Tyrol, Austria
- Ehrenberg, Arizona, United States
- Ehrenberg Island, Svalbard, Norway

== People ==
- Ehrenberg (surname)

== See also ==
- Ehrenburg (disambiguation)
- Ehrenbaum
- Ehrenstein
