= Ehrenfels Castle =

Ehrenfels Castle may refer to:

- Ehrenfels Castle (Bavaria), Beratzhausen, District of Regensburg, Germany
- Ehrenfels Castle (Grisons), in Sils im Domleschg, Switzerland
- Ehrenfels Castle (Kammern im Liesingtal), in Styria near Kammern im Liesingtal, Austria
- Ehrenfels Castle (Hesse), a ruined castle on the Rhine River in Germany, near Rüdesheim am Rhein
- Ehrenfels Castle (St. Radegund), in Styria, Austria
