= Triple product rule =

Relation between relative derivatives of three variables

The triple product rule, known variously as the cyclic chain rule, cyclic relation, cyclical rule, Euler's chain rule, or the reciprocity theorem, is a formula which relates partial derivatives of three interdependent variables. The rule finds application in thermodynamics, where frequently three variables can be related by a function of the form f(x, y, z) = 0, so each variable is given as an implicit function of the other two variables. For example, an equation of state for a fluid relates temperature, pressure, and volume in this manner. The triple product rule for such interrelated variables x, y, and z comes from using a reciprocity relation on the result of the implicit function theorem, and is given by

$$\left(\frac{\partial x}{\partial y}\right)\left(\frac{\partial y}{\partial z}\right)\left(\frac{\partial z}{\partial x}\right) = -1,$$

where each factor is a partial derivative of the variable in the numerator, considered to be a function of the other two.

The advantage of the triple product rule is that by rearranging terms, one can derive a number of substitution identities which allow one to replace partial derivatives which are difficult to analytically evaluate, experimentally measure, or integrate with quotients of partial derivatives which are easier to work with. For example,

$$\left(\frac{\partial x}{\partial y}\right) = - \frac{\left(\frac{\partial z}{\partial y}\right)}{\left(\frac{\partial z}{\partial x}\right)}$$

Various other forms of the rule are present in the literature; these can be derived by permuting the variables {x, y, z}.

== Derivation ==
An informal derivation follows. Suppose that f(x, y, z) = 0. Write z as a function of x and y. Thus the total differential dz is

$$dz = \left(\frac{\partial z}{\partial x}\right)dx + \left(\frac{\partial z}{\partial y}\right) dy$$

Suppose that we move along a curve with dz = 0, where the curve is parameterized by x. Thus y can be written in terms of x, so on this curve

$$dy = \left(\frac{\partial y}{\partial x}\right) dx$$

Therefore, the equation for dz = 0 becomes

$$0 = \left(\frac{\partial z}{\partial x}\right) \, dx + \left(\frac{\partial z}{\partial y}\right) \left(\frac{\partial y}{\partial x}\right) \, dx$$

Since this must be true for all dx, rearranging terms gives

$$\left(\frac{\partial z}{\partial x}\right) = -\left(\frac{\partial z}{\partial y}\right) \left(\frac{\partial y}{\partial x}\right)$$

Dividing by the derivatives on the right hand side gives the triple product rule

$$\left(\frac{\partial x}{\partial y}\right)\left(\frac{\partial y}{\partial z}\right) \left(\frac{\partial z}{\partial x}\right) = -1$$

Note that this proof makes many implicit assumptions regarding the existence of partial derivatives, the existence of the exact differential dz, the ability to construct a curve in some neighborhood with dz = 0, and the nonzero value of partial derivatives and their reciprocals. A formal proof based on mathematical analysis would eliminate these potential ambiguities.

=== Alternative derivation ===
Suppose a function f(x, y, z) = 0, where x, y, and z are functions of each other. Write the total differentials of the variables
$$dx = \left(\frac{\partial x}{\partial y}\right) dy + \left(\frac{\partial x}{\partial z}\right) dz$$
$$dy = \left(\frac{\partial y}{\partial x}\right) dx + \left(\frac{\partial y}{\partial z}\right) dz$$
Substitute dy into dx
$$dx = \left(\frac{\partial x}{\partial y}\right) \left[ \left(\frac{\partial y}{\partial x}\right) dx + \left(\frac{\partial y}{\partial z}\right) dz\right] + \left(\frac{\partial x}{\partial z}\right) dz$$
By using the chain rule one can show the coefficient of dx on the right hand side is equal to one, thus the coefficient of dz must be zero
$$\left(\frac{\partial x}{\partial y}\right) \left(\frac{\partial y}{\partial z}\right) + \left(\frac{\partial x}{\partial z}\right) = 0$$
Subtracting the second term and multiplying by its inverse gives the triple product rule
$$\left(\frac{\partial x}{\partial y}\right) \left(\frac{\partial y}{\partial z}\right) \left(\frac{\partial z}{\partial x}\right) = -1.$$

=== Short derivation ===
This section is based on chapter 5 of Pippard.

Suppose we are given four real variables $(x, y, z, w)$, restricted to move on a 2-dimensional $C^2$ surface in $\R^4$. Then, if we know two of them, we can determine the other two uniquely (generically).

In particular, we may take any two variables as the independent variables, and let the other two be the dependent variables, then we can take all these partial derivatives.

Proposition: $\left(\frac{\partial x}{\partial y}\right)_z \left(\frac{\partial y}{\partial z}\right)_x \left(\frac{\partial z}{\partial x}\right)_y = -1$

Proof. We can ignore $w$. Then locally the surface is just $ax + by + cz + d = 0$. Then $\left(\frac{\partial x}{\partial y}\right)_z = -\frac{b}{a}$, etc. Now multiply them.

== Applications ==
=== Example: Ideal Gas Law ===
The ideal gas law relates the state variables of pressure (P), volume (V), and temperature (T) via

$$PV=nRT$$

which can be written as

$$f(P,V,T) = PV-nRT = 0$$

so each state variable can be written as an implicit function of the other state variables:

$$\begin{align}
P &= P(V,T) = \frac{nRT}{V} \\[1em]
V &= V(P,T) = \frac{nRT}{P} \\[1em]
T &= T(P,V) = \frac{PV}{nR}
\end{align}$$

From the above expressions, we have

$$\begin{align}
-1 &= \left( \frac{\partial P}{\partial V} \right) \left( \frac{\partial V}{\partial T} \right) \left( \frac{\partial T}{\partial P} \right) \\[1em]
&= \left( -\frac{nRT}{V^2} \right) \left( \frac{nR}{P} \right) \left( \frac{V}{nR} \right) \\[1em]
&= \left( -\frac{nRT}{PV} \right) \\[1em]
& = -\frac{P}{P} = -1
\end{align}$$

=== Geometric Realization ===
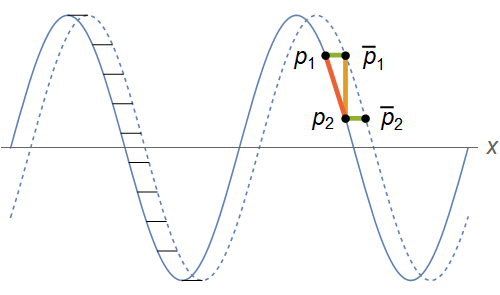
The profile of a traveling wave at time t (solid line) and t+Δt (dashed line). In the time interval Δt, the point p_{2} will rise up to the same height that p_{1} had at time t.

A geometric realization of the triple product rule can be found in its close ties to the velocity of a traveling wave

$$\phi(x,t) = A \cos (kx - \omega t)$$

shown on the right at time t (solid blue line) and at a short time later t+Δt (dashed). The wave maintains its shape as it propagates, so that a point at position x at time t will correspond to a point at position x+Δx at time t+Δt,

$$A \cos (kx - \omega t) = A \cos (k (x + \Delta x) - \omega (t + \Delta t)).$$

This equation can only be satisfied for all x and t if k Δx − ω Δt = 0, resulting in the formula for the phase velocity

$$v = \frac{\Delta x}{\Delta t} = \frac{\omega}{k}.$$

To elucidate the connection with the triple product rule, consider the point p_{1} at time t and its corresponding point (with the same height) p̄_{1} at t+Δt. Define p_{2} as the point at time t whose x-coordinate matches that of p̄_{1}, and define p̄_{2} to be the corresponding point of p_{2} as shown in the figure on the right. The distance Δx between p_{1} and p̄_{1} is the same as the distance between p_{2} and p̄_{2} (green lines), and dividing this distance by Δt yields the speed of the wave.

To compute Δx, consider the two partial derivatives computed at p_{2},

$$\left( \frac{\partial \phi}{\partial t} \right) \Delta t = \text{rise from }p_2\text{ to }\bar{p}_1\text{ in time }\Delta t\text{ (gold line)}$$
$$\left( \frac{\partial \phi}{\partial x} \right) = \text{slope of the wave (red line) at time }t.$$

Dividing these two partial derivatives and using the definition of the slope (rise divided by run) gives us the desired formula for

$$\Delta x = - \frac{\left( \frac{\partial \phi}{\partial t} \right) \Delta t}{\left( \frac{\partial \phi}{\partial x} \right)},$$

where the negative sign accounts for the fact that p_{1} lies behind p_{2} relative to the wave's motion. Thus, the wave's velocity is given by

$$v = \frac{\Delta x}{\Delta t} = - \frac{\left( \frac{\partial \phi}{\partial t} \right)}{\left( \frac{\partial \phi}{\partial x} \right)}.$$

For infinitesimal Δt, $\frac{\Delta x}{\Delta t} = \left( \frac{\partial x}{\partial t} \right)$ and we recover the triple product rule

$$v = \frac{\Delta x}{\Delta t} = - \frac{\left( \frac{\partial \phi}{\partial t} \right)}{\left( \frac{\partial \phi}{\partial x} \right)}.$$

== See also ==
- Differentiation rules – Rules for computing derivatives of functions
- Exact differential – Type of infinitesimal in calculus (has another derivation of the triple product rule)
- Product rule – Formula for the derivative of a product
- Total derivative – Type of derivative in mathematics
- Triple product – Ternary operation on vectors and scalars.
