= Burg Kammerstein =

Castle ruin in Austria

Coordinates: 47°24′07″N 14°53′09″E

Burg Kammerstein/ Ehrenfels
- Styria, Austria
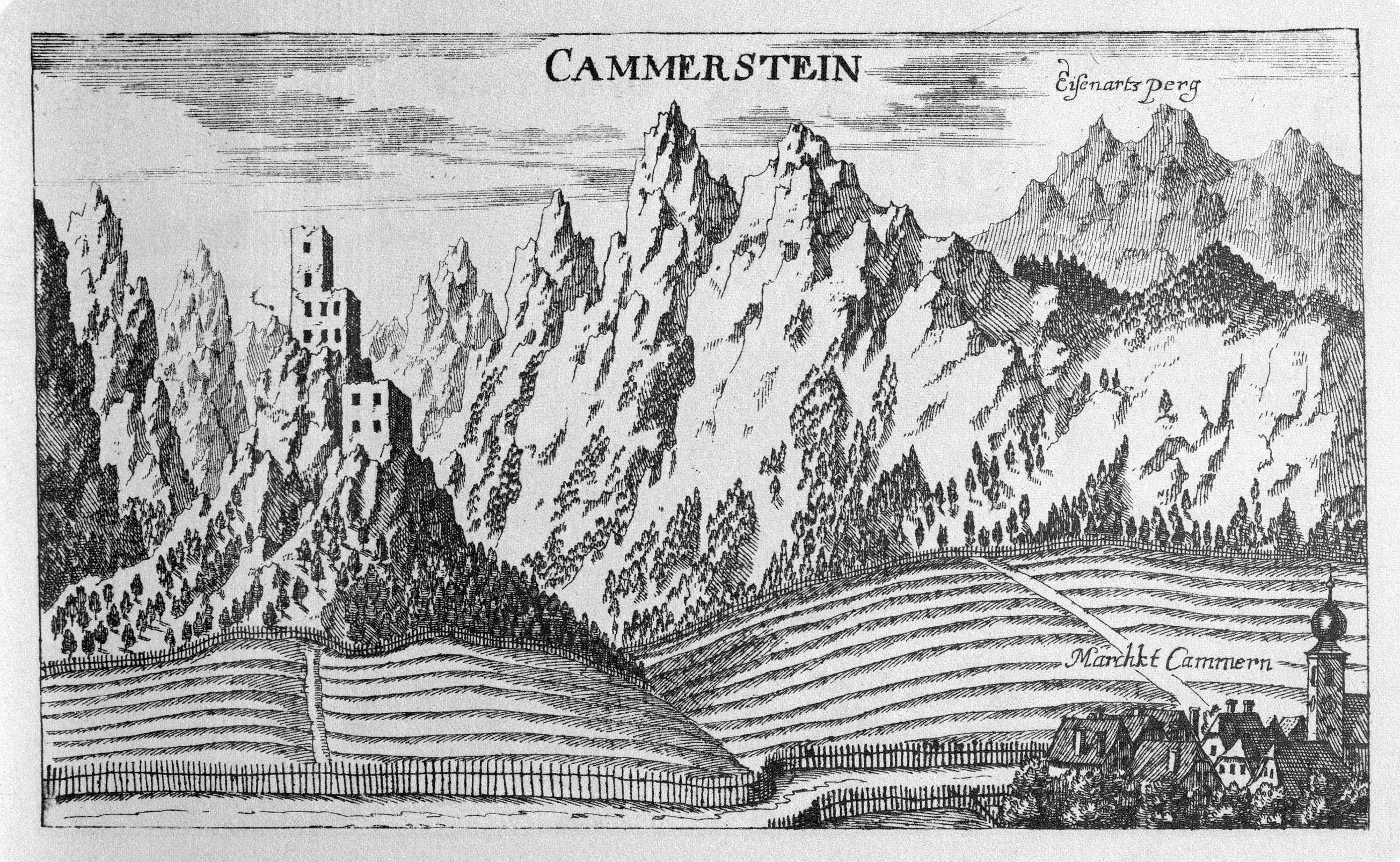

Site information
- Type: Hilltop castle

Site history
- Built: first mentioned 1150

Burg Kammerstein/ Ehrenfels was a hilltop castle in the town of Kammern im Liesingtal in Styria, Austria. Burg Kammerstein is 129 metres (423 ft) above sea level.

== Location ==
The remains of the castle are situated on a rocky outcrop in the north-west of the village Kammern in the valley of the Liesing River, at an elevation of 996m above sea level.

== History ==
The foundations of the castle date back to the 12th century, first mentioned in writing in 1150.

From the 13th century, the castle belonged to the estate of the Ehrenfels family, who were retainers of the Styrian sovereignty. The family remained the castle-owners until the beginning of the 15th century. In 1513 the castle was managed by Siegmund von Dietrichstein, who intended to expand the structure.

Under the influence of his father-in-law, Emperor Maximilian I, this expansion did not occur. However, minor renovation works were carried out.

By 1542 the castle was described as decayed, and by 1681 the cartographer Georg Matthaus Vischer depicted it as a ruin.

== See also ==
- List of castles in Austria
