= Ehrenburg (Plaue) =

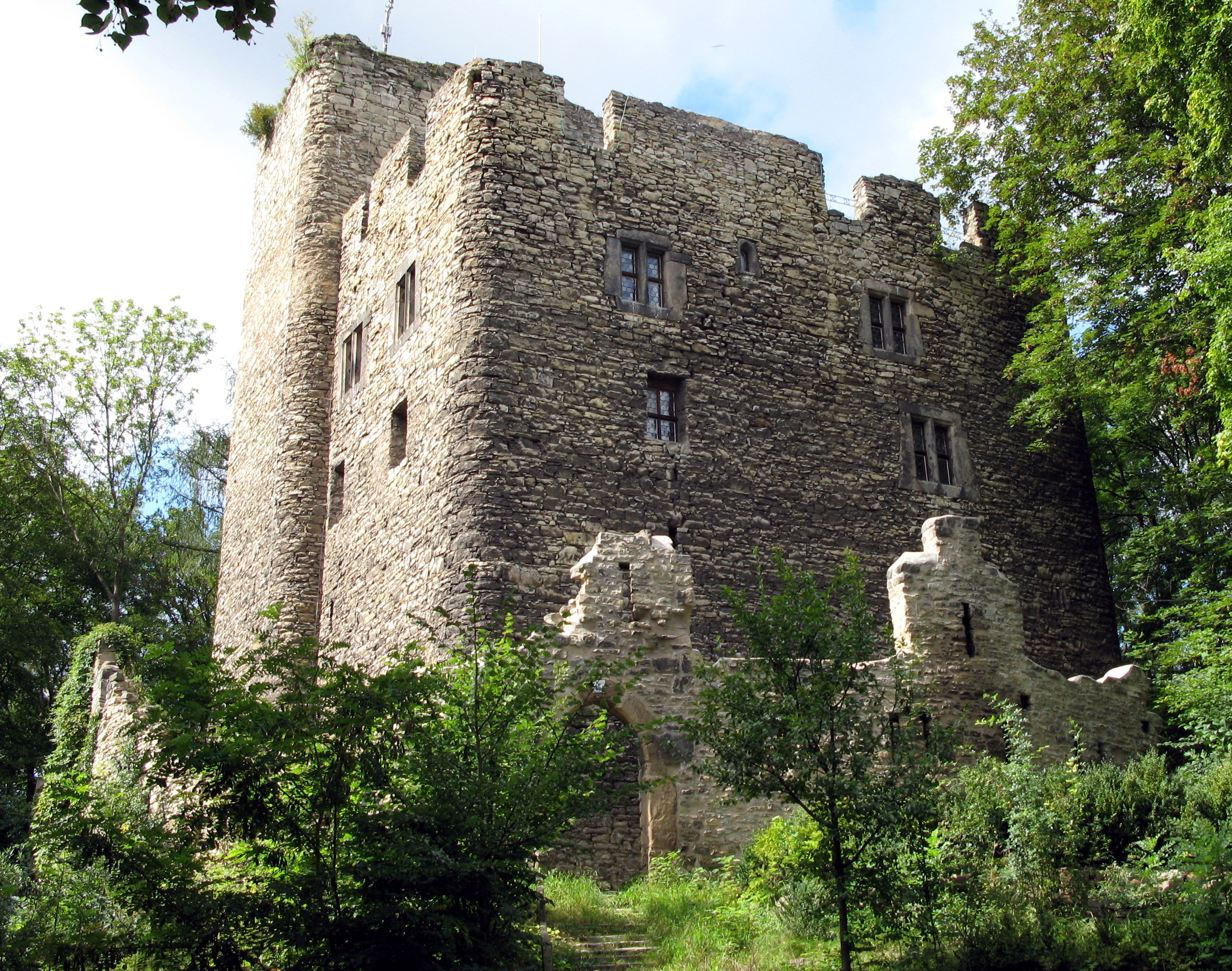

- Location within Thuringia Ehrenburg (Germany)

General information
- Architectural style: Fortified Castle
- Location: Plaue, Germany
- Coordinates: 50°46′45″N 10°53′45″E
- Construction started: 1324

The Ehrenburg (Honour Castle) is a castle overlooking the city of Plaue in Thuringia (Germany).

== History ==
- The burg was constructed in 1324 by the Grafen von Schwarzburg.
- By the 16th century the burg was no longer in use and began to decay.
- In 1856 the first restoration of the walls began.
- In 1912 the Burg was sold and converted into an inn.
- Today it is a private residence.

== Plan ==
The building consists of a central tower surrounded by a defensive wall.
