= Ehrenpreis =

Ehrenpreis is a surname. Notable people with the surname include:

- Leon Ehrenpreis (1930–2010), American mathematician
  - Ehrenpreis conjecture
  - Malgrange–Ehrenpreis theorem
- Mordecai Ehrenpreis, (1869–1951), Polish-Swedish rabbi

== See also ==
- Veronica (plant), German name: Ehrenpreis
