= Ehrenfels Castle (St. Radegund) =

Castle in Styria, Austria

Coordinates: 47°10′44″N 15°28′25″E

- Burg Ehrenfels/ Klamm bei Radegund
- Styria, Austria
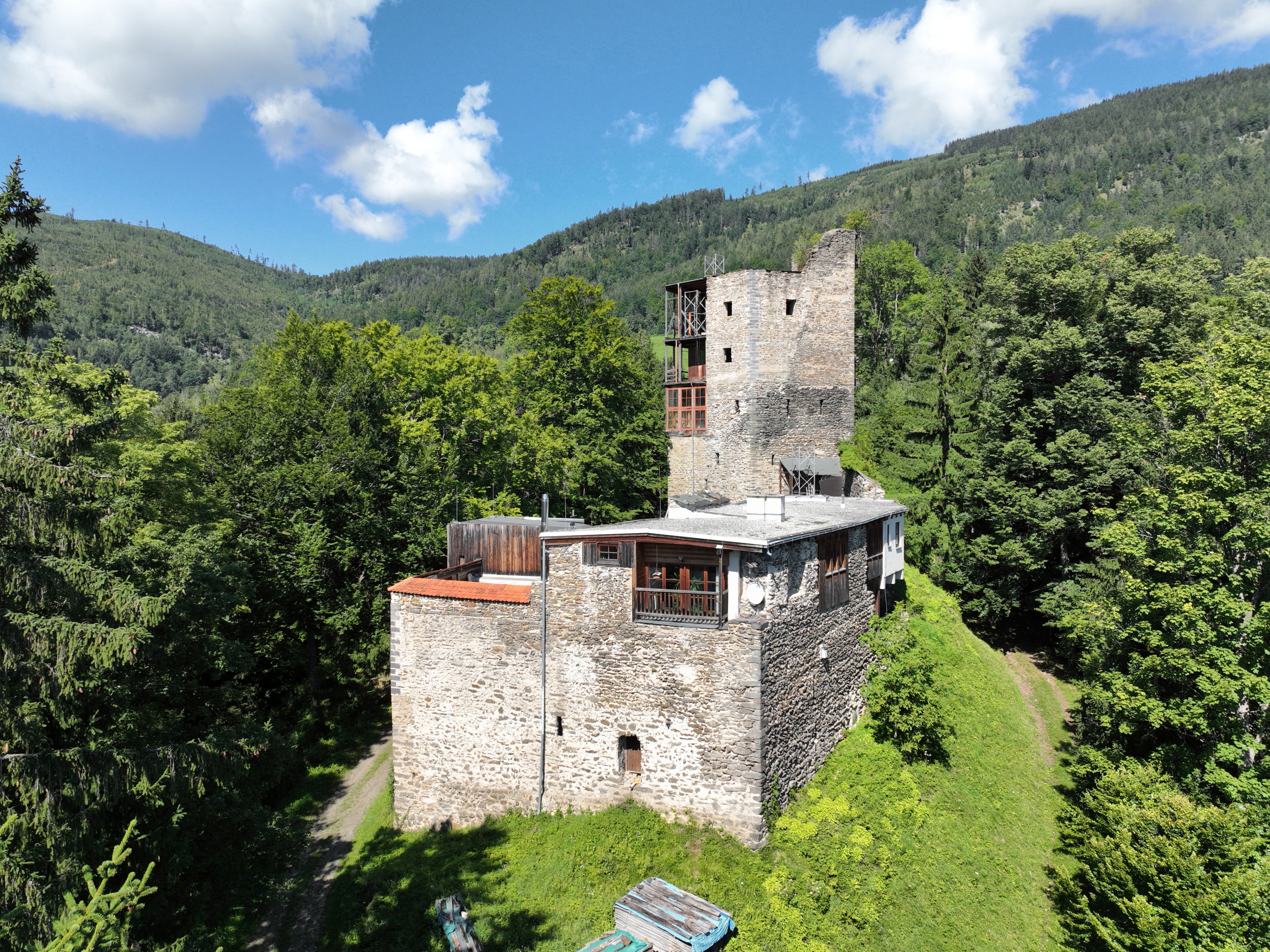
- Tower of the Ehrenfels Castle

Site information
- Type: Castle

Ehrenfels Castle (German: Burg Ehrenfels/ Klamm bei Radegund) is a castle in Styria, Austria. Burg Ehrenfels is 481 metres (1,578 ft) above sea level.

== See also ==
- List of castles in Austria
