= Ehrenfeld (surname) =

Ehrenfeld is a German surname. This is generally considered to be an habitational name, taken on from any of several places named Ehrenfeld.

Ehrenfeld is an ancient Christian surname, but there are also a significant number of Jewish people bearing it. Notable people with the surname include:

- Akiva Ehrenfeld (1923–2012), president of Kiryat Mattersdorf
- Shmuel Ehrenfeld, the Mattersdorfer Rav
- Simon Ehrenfeld, Australian politician
- Rachel Ehrenfeld, Director of the American Center for Democracy
