= Ehrenbaum =

Ehrenbaum is a surname. Notable people with the surname include:

- Ernst Ehrenbaum (1861–1942), German researcher of aquaculture, fishes
- Hans Ehrenbaum-Degele (1889–1915), Jewish German writer
