= Ehrenfest equations =

Ehrenfest equations (named after Paul Ehrenfest) are equations which describe changes in specific heat capacity and derivatives of specific volume in second-order phase transitions. The Clausius–Clapeyron relation does not make sense for second-order phase transitions, as both specific entropy and specific volume do not change in second-order phase transitions.

== Quantitative consideration ==
Ehrenfest equations are the consequence of continuity of specific entropy $s$ and specific volume $v$, which are first derivatives of specific Gibbs free energy – in second-order phase transitions. If one considers specific entropy $s$ as a function of temperature and pressure, then its differential is:
$$ds = \left( {{{\partial s} \over {\partial T}}} \right)_P dT + \left( {{{\partial s} \over {\partial P}}} \right)_T dP.$$
As $\left( {{{\partial s} \over {\partial T}}} \right)_P = {{c_P } \over T}$, $\left( {{{\partial s} \over {\partial P}}} \right)_T = - \left( {{{\partial v} \over {\partial T}}} \right)_P$, then the differential of specific entropy also is:

$$d {s_i}  = {{c_{i P} } \over T}dT - \left( {{{\partial v_i } \over {\partial T}}} \right)_P dP,$$

where $i=1$ and $i=2$ are the two phases which transit one into other. Due to continuity of specific entropy, the following holds in second-order phase transitions: ${ds_1} = {ds_2}$. So,

$$\left( {c_{2P}  - c_{1P} } \right){{dT} \over T} = \left[ {\left( {{{\partial v_2 } \over {\partial T}}} \right)_P  - \left( {{{\partial v_1 } \over {\partial T}}} \right)_P } \right]dP$$

Therefore, the first Ehrenfest equation is:

$${\Delta c_P  = T \cdot \Delta \left( {\left( {{{\partial v} \over {\partial T}}} \right)_P } \right) \cdot {{dP} \over {dT}}}.$$

The second Ehrenfest equation is got in a like manner, but specific entropy is considered as a function of temperature and specific volume:

$${\Delta c_V  =  - T \cdot \Delta \left( {\left( {{{\partial P} \over {\partial T}}} \right)_v } \right) \cdot {{dv} \over {dT}}}$$

The third Ehrenfest equation is got in a like manner, but specific entropy is considered as a function of $v$ and $P$:

$${\Delta \left( {{{\partial v} \over {\partial T}}} \right)_P  = \Delta \left( {\left( {{{\partial P} \over {\partial T}}} \right)_v } \right) \cdot {{dv} \over {dP}}}.$$

Continuity of specific volume as a function of $T$ and $P$ gives the fourth Ehrenfest equation:

$${\Delta \left( {{{\partial v} \over {\partial T}}} \right)_P  =  - \Delta \left( {\left( {{{\partial v} \over {\partial P}}} \right)_T } \right) \cdot {{dP} \over {dT}}}.$$

== Limitations ==
Derivatives of Gibbs free energy are not always finite. Transitions between different magnetic states of metals can't be described by Ehrenfest equations.

== See also ==
- Paul Ehrenfest
- Clausius–Clapeyron relation
- Phase transition
