= Ehrenstein =

Ehrenstein is a German surname. Notable people with the surname include:

- Albert Ehrenstein (1886-1950), Hungarian-Austrian writer
- David Ehrenstein (born 1947), American critic

Ehrenstein may also refer to:

- Schloß Ehrenstein (Ehrenstein Castle), a castle in Ohrdruf, Thuringia, Germany.

== See also ==
- Ehrenstein illusion
