= Enthalpy of fusion =

Enthalpy change when a substance melts

Enthalpies of melting and boiling for pure elements versus temperatures of transition, demonstrating Trouton's rule

In thermodynamics, the enthalpy of fusion, also known as latent heat of fusion or heat of fusion, of a substance is the change in its enthalpy resulting from providing energy, typically heat, to a specific quantity of the substance to change its state from a solid to a liquid, at constant pressure.

The enthalpy of fusion is the amount of energy required to convert one mole of solid into liquid. For example, when melting 1 kg of ice (at 0 °C under a wide range of pressures), 333.55 kJ of energy is absorbed with no temperature change. The heat of solidification (when a substance changes from liquid to solid) is equal in magnitude and opposite in sign.

This energy includes the contribution required to make room for any associated change in volume by displacing its environment against ambient pressure. The temperature at which the phase transition occurs is the melting point or the freezing point, according to context. By convention, the pressure is assumed to be 1 atm (101.325 kPa) unless otherwise specified.

== Overview ==
The enthalpy of fusion is a latent heat, because, while melting, the heat energy needed to change the substance from solid to liquid does not cause any increase in temperature. Temperature remains constant during the freezing or melting process, and only begins to change again (assuming the energy input or removal (cooling) continues) after the phase change is complete. The latent heat of fusion is the enthalpy change of any amount of substance when it melts. When the heat of fusion is referenced to a unit of mass, it is usually called the specific heat of fusion, while the molar heat of fusion refers to the enthalpy change per amount of substance in moles.

The liquid phase has a higher internal energy than the solid phase. This means energy must be supplied to a solid in order to melt it and energy is released from a liquid when it freezes, because the molecules in the liquid experience weaker intermolecular forces and so have a higher potential energy (a kind of bond-dissociation energy for intermolecular forces).

When liquid water is cooled, its temperature falls steadily until it drops just below the line of freezing point at 0 °C. The temperature then remains constant at the freezing point while the water crystallizes. Once the water is completely frozen, its temperature resumes a colder trend.

The enthalpy of fusion is almost always a positive quantity; helium is the only known exception. Helium-3 has a negative enthalpy of fusion at temperatures below 0.3 K. Helium-4 also has a very slightly negative enthalpy of fusion below 0.77 K (−272.380 °C). This means that, at appropriate constant pressures, these substances freeze with the addition of heat. In the case of ^{4}He, this pressure range is between 24.992 and 25.00 atm (2,533 kPa).

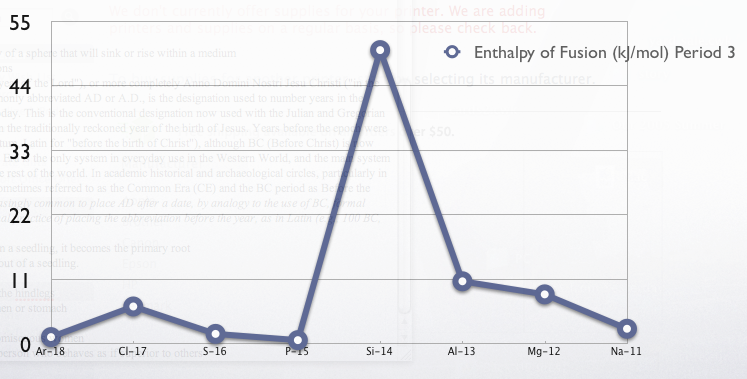
Standard enthalpy change of fusion of period three

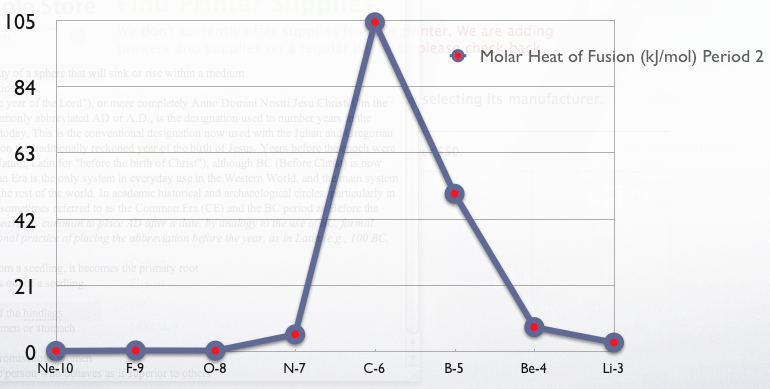
Standard enthalpy change of fusion of period two of the periodic table of elements

Substance	Heat of fusion		Melting temperature, °C
Substance	(cal/g)	(J/g)	Melting temperature, °C
water	79.72	333.55	0.0
methane	13.96	58.99	−182.46
propane	19.11	79.96	−187.7
glycerol	47.95	200.62	17.8
formic acid	66.05	276.35	8.4
acetic acid	45.90	192.09	16 - 17
acetone	23.42	97.99	−94.9
benzene	30.45	127.40	5.53
myristic acid	47.49	198.70	54.4
palmitic acid	39.18	163.93	62.9
sodium acetate/H2O	63–69	264–289	58 (trihydrate)
sodium sulfate/H2O	61	254	32.38 (decahydrate)
stearic acid	47.54	198.91	69.3
gallium	19.2	80.4	29.76
paraffin wax (C_{25}H_{52})	47.8–52.6	200–220	46 - 68

These values are mostly from the CRC Handbook of Chemistry and Physics, 62nd edition. The conversion between cal/g and J/g in the above table uses the thermochemical calorie (cal_{th}) = 4.184 joules rather than the International Steam Table calorie (cal_{INT}) = 4.1868 joules.

== Examples ==
- To heat 1 kg of liquid water from 0 °C to 20 °C requires 83.6 kJ (see below). However, heating 1 kg of ice from 0 °C to 20 °C requires additional energy to melt the ice. We can treat these two processes independently and using the specific heat capacity of water to be 4.18 J/(g⋅K); thus, to heat 1 kg of ice from 273.15 K to water at 293.15 K (0 °C to 20 °C) requires:
  - (1) 333.55 J/g (heat of fusion of ice) = 333.55 kJ/kg = 333.55 kJ for 1 kg of ice to melt, plus
  - (2) 4.18 J/(g⋅°C) × 20 °C = 4.18 kJ/(kg⋅°C) × 20 °C = 83.6 kJ for 1 kg of water to increase in temperature by 20 °C
  - (1 + 2) 333.55 kJ + 83.6 kJ = 417.15 kJ for 1 kg of ice to increase in temperature by 20 °C
- Silicon has a heat of fusion of 50.21 kJ/mol. 50 kW of power can supply the energy required to melt about 100 kg of silicon in one hour:
  - 50 kW = 50kJ/s = 180000kJ/h
  - 180000kJ/h × (1 mol Si)/50.21kJ × 28gSi/(mol Si) × 1kgSi/1000gSi = 100.4kg/h

== Solubility prediction ==
The heat of fusion can also be used to predict solubility for solids in liquids. Provided an ideal solution is obtained the mole fraction $(x_2)$ of solute at saturation is a function of the heat of fusion, the melting point of the solid $(T_\text{fus})$ and the temperature $(T)$ of the solution:

$$\ln x_2  = - \frac {\Delta H^\circ_\text{fus}}{R} \left(\frac{1}{T}- \frac{1}{T_\text{fus}}\right)$$

Here, $R$ is the gas constant. For example, the solubility of paracetamol in water at 298 K is predicted to be:

$$x_2  = \exp {\left[- \frac {28100 ~\text{J mol}^{-1}} {8.314 ~\text{J K}^{-1} ~\text{mol}^{-1}}\left(\frac{1}{298 ~\text{K}}- \frac{1}{442 ~\text{K}}\right)\right]} = 0.0248$$

Since the molar mass of water and paracetamol are 18.0153gmol^{−1} and 151.17gmol^{−1} and the density of the solution is 1000gL^{−1}, an estimate of the solubility in grams per liter is:

- $\frac{0.0248 \times \frac{1000 ~\text{g L}^{-1}}{18.0153 ~\text{g mol}^{-1}}}{1-0.0248} \times 151.17 ~\text{g mol}^{-1} = 213.4 ~\text{g L}^{-1}$
- 1000 g/L * (mol/18.0153g) is an estimate of the number of moles of molecules in 1L solution, using water density as a reference;
- 0.0248 * (1000 g/L * (mol/18.0153g)) is the molar fraction of substance in saturated solution with a unit of mol/L;
- 0.0248 * (1000 g/L * (mol/18.0153g)) * 151.17g/mol is the solute's molar fraction equivalent mass conversion;
- 1-0.0248 will be the fraction of the solution that is solvent.

which is a deviation from the real solubility (240 g/L) of 11%. This error can be reduced when an additional heat capacity parameter is taken into account.

=== Proof ===
At equilibrium the chemical potentials for the solute in the solution and pure solid are identical:

$$\mu^\circ_\text{solid} = \mu^\circ_\text{solute}\,$$

or

$$\mu^\circ_\text{solid} = \mu^\circ_\text{liquid} + RT\ln X_2\,$$

with $R\,$ the gas constant and $T\,$ the temperature.

Rearranging gives:

$$RT\ln X_2  = -\left(\mu^\circ_\text{liquid} -  \mu^\circ_\text{solid}\right)\,$$

and since

$$\Delta G^\circ_\text{fus}  = \mu^\circ_\text{liquid} -  \mu^\circ_\text{solid}\,$$

the heat of fusion being the difference in chemical potential between the pure liquid and the pure solid, it follows that

$$RT\ln X_2  = -\left(\Delta G^\circ_\text{fus}\right)\,$$

Application of the Gibbs–Helmholtz equation:

$$\left( \frac{\partial \left( \frac{\Delta G^\circ_\text{fus} } {T} \right) } {\partial T} \right)_{p\,} = -\frac {\Delta H^\circ_\text{fus}} {T^2}$$

ultimately gives:

$$\left( \frac{\partial \left( \ln X_2 \right) } {\partial T} \right) = \frac {\Delta H^\circ_\text{fus}} {RT^2}$$

or:

$$\partial \ln X_2 = \frac {\Delta H^\circ_\text{fus}} {RT^2} \times \delta T$$

and with integration:

$$\int^{X_2=x_2}_{X_2 = 1} \delta \ln X_2 = \ln x_2  = \int_{T_\text{fus}}^T \frac {\Delta H^\circ_\text{fus}} {RT^2} \times \Delta T$$

the result is obtained:

$$\ln x_2  = - \frac {\Delta H^\circ_\text{fus}} {R}\left(\frac{1}{T}- \frac{1}{T_\text{fus}}\right)$$

== See also ==
- Enthalpy of vaporization
- Heat capacity
- Thermodynamic databases for pure substances
- Joback method (Estimation of the heat of fusion from molecular structure)
- Latent heat
- Lattice energy
- Heat of dilution
