= Chemical composition =

Identity, arrangement, and ratio of the elements that make up a compound

A chemical composition specifies the identity, arrangement, and ratio of the chemical elements making up a compound by way of chemical and atomic bonds.

Chemical formulas can be used to describe the relative amounts of elements present in a compound. For example, the chemical formula for water is H_{2}O: this means that each molecule of water is constituted by 2 atoms of hydrogen (H) and 1 atom of oxygen (O). The chemical composition of water may be interpreted as a 2:1 ratio of hydrogen atoms to oxygen atoms. Different types of chemical formulas are used to convey composition information, such as an empirical or molecular formula.

Nomenclature can be used to express not only the elements present in a compound but their arrangement within the molecules of the compound. In this way, compounds will have unique names which can describe their elemental composition.

== Composition of mixtures ==
The chemical composition of a mixture can be defined as the distribution of the individual substances that constitute the mixture, called "components". In other words, it is equivalent to quantifying the concentration of each component. Because there are different ways to define the concentration of a component, there are also different ways to define the composition of a mixture. It may be expressed as molar fraction, volume fraction, mass fraction, molality, molarity or normality or mixing ratio.

Chemical composition of a mixture can be represented graphically in plots like ternary plot and quaternary plot.
