= Excess property =

Difference in value between properties of an ideal and real mixture

In chemical thermodynamics, excess properties are properties of mixtures which quantify the non-ideal behavior of real mixtures. They are defined as the difference between the value of the property in a real mixture and the value that would exist in an ideal solution under the same conditions. The most frequently used excess properties are the excess volume, excess enthalpy, and excess chemical potential. The excess volume (V^{E}), internal energy (U^{E}), and enthalpy (H^{E}) are identical to the corresponding mixing properties; that is,

$$\begin{align}
V^E &= \Delta V_\text{mix} \\
H^E &= \Delta H_\text{mix} \\
U^E &= \Delta U_\text{mix}
\end{align}$$

These relationships hold because the volume, internal energy, and enthalpy changes of mixing are zero for an ideal solution.

== Definition ==
By definition, excess properties are related to those of the ideal solution by:

$$z^E = z - z^\text{IS}$$

Here, the superscript IS denotes the value in the ideal solution, a superscript $E$ denotes the excess molar property, and $z$ denotes the particular property under consideration. From the properties of partial molar properties,

$$z = \sum_i x_i \overline{z_i};$$

substitution yields:

$$z^E = \sum_i x_i\left(\overline{z_i} - \overline{z_i^\text{IS}}\right).$$

For volumes, internal energies, and enthalpies, the partial molar quantities in the ideal solution are identical to the molar quantities in the pure components; that is,

$$\begin{align}
\overline{V_i^\text{IS}} &= V_i \\
\overline{H_i^\text{IS}} &= H_i \\
\overline{U_i^\text{IS}} &= U_i
\end{align}$$

Because the ideal solution has molar entropy of mixing

$$\Delta S_\text{mix}^\text{IS} = -R \sum_i x_i \ln x_i,$$

where $x_i$ is the mole fraction, the partial molar entropy is not equal to the molar entropy:

$$\overline{S_i^\text{IS}} = S_i - R \ln x_i.$$

One can therefore define the excess partial molar quantity the same way:

$$\overline{z_i^E} = \overline{z_i} - \overline{z_i^\text{IS}}.$$

Several of these results are summarized in the next section.

== Examples of excess partial molar properties ==
$$\begin{align}
\overline{V^E_i} &= \overline{V_i} - \overline{V^\text{IS}_i} = \overline{V_i} - V_i \\
\overline{H^E_i} &= \overline{H_i} - \overline{H^\text{IS}_i} = \overline{H_i} - H_i \\
\overline{S^E_i} &= \overline{S_i} - \overline{S^\text{IS}_i} = \overline{S_i} - S_i + R \ln x_i \\
\overline{G^E_i} &= \overline{G_i} - \overline{G^\text{IS}_i} = \overline{G_i} - G_i - RT \ln x_i
\end{align}$$

The pure component's molar volume and molar enthalpy are equal to the corresponding partial molar quantities because there is no volume or internal energy change on mixing for an ideal solution.

The molar volume of a mixture can be found from the sum of the excess volumes of the components of a mixture:

$${V} = \sum_i x_i (V_i + \overline{V_i^E}).$$

This formula holds because there is no change in volume upon mixing for an ideal mixture. The molar entropy, in contrast, is given by

$${S} = \sum_i x_i (S_i - R\ln x_i + \overline{S_i^E}),$$

where the $R\ln x_i$ term originates from the entropy of mixing of an ideal mixture.

=== Relation to activity coefficients ===
The excess partial molar Gibbs free energy is used to define the activity coefficient,

$$\overline{G^E_i} = RT \ln\gamma_i$$

By way of Maxwell reciprocity; that is, because

$$\frac{\partial^2 nG}{\partial n_i \partial P} = \frac{\partial^2 nG}{\partial P \partial n_i},$$

the excess molar volume of component $i$ is connected to the derivative of its activity coefficient:

$$\overline{V^E_i} = RT \frac{\partial \ln \gamma_i}{\partial P}.$$

This expression can be further processed by taking the activity coefficient's derivative out of the logarithm by logarithmic derivative.

$$\overline{V^E_i} = \frac{RT}{\gamma_i}\frac{\partial \gamma_i}{\partial P}$$

This formula can be used to compute the excess volume from a pressure-explicit activity coefficient model. Similarly, the excess enthalpy is related to derivatives of the activity coefficients via

$$\overline{H^E_i} = -RT^2 \frac{\partial\ln\gamma_i}{\partial T}.$$

== Derivatives to state parameters ==
=== Thermal expansivities ===
By taking the derivative of the volume with respect to temperature, the thermal expansion coefficients of the components in a mixture can be related to the thermal expansion coefficient of the mixture:

$$\frac{\partial V}{\partial T} = \sum_i x_i \frac{\partial V_i}{\partial T} + \sum_i x_i \frac{\partial \overline{V_i^E}}{\partial T}$$

Equivalently:

$$\alpha V = \sum_i x_i V_i \alpha_{i} + \sum_i x_i \frac{\partial \overline{V_i^E}}{\partial T}$$

Substituting the temperature derivative of the excess partial molar volume,

$$\frac{\partial \overline{V^E_i}}{\partial T} = R \frac{\partial \ln \gamma_i}{\partial P} + RT \frac{\partial^2 \ln \gamma_i}{\partial T\partial P}$$

one can relate the thermal expansion coefficients to the derivatives of the activity coefficients.

=== Isothermal compressibility ===
Another measurable volumetric derivative is the isothermal compressibility, $\beta$. This quantity can be related to derivatives of the excess molar volume, and thus the activity coefficients:

$$\beta = \frac{-1}{V} \left(\frac{\partial V}{\partial P}\right)_T = \frac{1}{V} \sum_i x_i V_i \beta_i - \frac{RT}{V} \sum_i x_i \left(\frac{\partial^2\ln\gamma_i}{\partial P^2}\right).$$

== See also ==
- Apparent molar property
- Enthalpy change of solution
- Enthalpy of fusion
- Enthalpy of mixing
- Heat of dilution
- Ideal solution
- Lattice energy
- Solubility equilibrium
- Virial expansion
- Volume fraction
