= Partial specific volume =

The partial specific volume $\bar{v_i},$ express the variation of the extensive volume of a mixture in respect to composition of the masses. It is the partial derivative of volume with respect to the mass of the component of interest.

$$V=\sum _{i=1}^n m_i \bar{v_i},$$

where $\bar{v_i}$ is the partial specific volume of a component $i$ defined as:

$$\bar{v_i}=\left( \frac{\partial V}{\partial m_i} \right)_{T,P,m_{j\neq i}}.$$

The PSV is usually measured in milliLiters (mL) per gram (g), proteins > 30 kDa can often be assumed to have a partial specific volume of 0.708 mL/g, though this estimate varies depending on the amount of volume accessible by solvent or bound molecules. Experimental determination is possible by measuring the natural frequency of a U-shaped tube filled successively with air, buffer and protein solution.

== Properties ==
The weighted sum of partial specific volumes of a mixture or solution is an inverse of density of the mixture namely the specific volume of the mixture.

$$v = \sum_i w_i\cdot \bar{v_i} = \frac {1}{\rho}$$

$$\sum_i \rho_i \cdot \bar{v_i} = 1$$

== See also ==
- Partial molar property
- Apparent molar property
