= Enthalpy change of solution =

Change in enthalpy from dissolving a substance

In thermochemistry, the enthalpy of solution (heat of solution or enthalpy of solvation) is the enthalpy change associated with the dissolution of a substance in a solvent at constant pressure resulting in infinite dilution.

The enthalpy of solution is most often expressed in kJ/mol at constant temperature. The energy change can be regarded as being made up of three parts: the endothermic breaking of bonds within the solute and within the solvent, and the formation of attractions between the solute and the solvent. An ideal solution has a null enthalpy of mixing. For a non-ideal solution, it is an excess molar quantity.

== Energetics ==
Dissolution by most gases is exothermic. That is, when a gas dissolves in a liquid solvent, energy is released as heat, warming both the system (i.e. the solution) and the surroundings.

The temperature of the solution eventually decreases to match that of the surroundings. The equilibrium, between the gas as a separate phase and the gas in solution, will by Le Châtelier's principle shift to favour the gas going into solution as the temperature is decreased (decreasing the temperature increases the solubility of a gas).

When a saturated solution of a gas is heated, gas comes out of the solution.

== Steps in dissolution ==
Dissolution can be viewed as occurring in three steps:

1. Breaking solute–solute attractions (endothermic), for instance, lattice energy $U_\text{latt}$ in salts.
2. Breaking solvent–solvent attractions (endothermic), for instance, that of hydrogen bonding.
3. Forming solvent–solute attractions (exothermic), in solvation.

The value of the enthalpy of solvation is the sum of these individual steps:

$$\Delta H_\text{solv} = \Delta H_\text{diss} + U_\text{latt}.$$

Dissolving ammonium nitrate in water is endothermic. The energy released by the solvation of the ammonium ions and nitrate ions is less than the energy absorbed in breaking up the ammonium nitrate ionic lattice and the attractions between water molecules. Dissolving potassium hydroxide is exothermic, as more energy is released during solvation than is used in breaking up the solute and solvent.

== Expressions in differential or integral form ==
The expressions of the enthalpy change of dissolution can be differential or integral, as a function of the ratio of amounts of solute-solvent.

The molar differential enthalpy change of dissolution is

$$\Delta_\text{diss}^\text{d} H = \left(\frac{\partial \Delta_\text{diss} H}{\partial \Delta n_i}\right)_{T,p,n_B},$$

where $\partial \Delta n_i$ is the infinitesimal variation, or differential, of the mole number of the solute during dissolution.

The integral heat of dissolution is defined as a process of obtaining a certain amount of solution with a final concentration. The enthalpy change in this process, normalized by the mole number of solute, is evaluated as the molar integral heat of dissolution. Mathematically, the molar integral heat of dissolution is denoted as

$$\Delta_\text{diss}^\text{i} H = \frac{\Delta_\text{diss} H}{n_B}.$$

The prime heat of dissolution is the differential heat of dissolution for obtaining an infinitely diluted solution.

== Dependence on the nature of the solution ==
The enthalpy of mixing of an ideal solution is zero by definition, but the enthalpy of dissolution of nonelectrolytes has the value of the enthalpy of fusion or vaporisation. For non-ideal solutions of electrolytes it is connected to the activity coefficient of the solute(s) and the temperature derivative of the relative permittivity through the following formula:
$$H_\text{dil} = \sum_i \nu_i RT \ln \gamma_i \left(1 + \frac{T}{\epsilon} \frac{\partial\epsilon}{\partial T}\right).$$

Enthalpy change of solution in water at 25 °C for some selected compounds
Compound	ΔH^{~~o~~} in kJ/mol
hydrochloric acid	−74.84
ammonium nitrate	+25.69
ammonia	−30.50
potassium hydroxide	−57.61
caesium hydroxide	−71.55
sodium chloride	+3.87
potassium chlorate	+41.38
acetic acid	−1.51
sodium hydroxide	−44.50

== See also ==
- Apparent molar property
- Enthalpy of mixing
- Heat of dilution
- Heat of melting
- Hydration energy
- Lattice energy
- Law of dilution
- Solvation
- Thermodynamic activity
- Solubility equilibrium
