= Volume fraction =

Proportion of the total volume of a constituent part

In chemistry and fluid mechanics, the volume fraction $\varphi_i$ is defined as the volume of a constituent V_{i} divided by the volume of all constituents of the mixture V prior to mixing:

$$\varphi_i = \frac {V_i}{\sum_j V_j}.$$

Being dimensionless, its unit is 1; it is expressed as a number, e.g., 0.18. It is the same concept as volume percent (vol%) except that the latter is expressed with a denominator of 100, e.g., 18%.

The volume fraction coincides with the volume concentration in ideal solutions where the volumes of the constituents are additive (the volume of the solution is equal to the sum of the volumes of its ingredients).

The sum of all volume fractions of a mixture is equal to 1:

$$\sum_{i=1}^{N} V_i = V ; \qquad \sum_{i=1}^{N} \varphi_i = 1.$$

The volume fraction (percentage by volume, vol%) is one way of expressing the composition of a mixture with a dimensionless quantity; mass fraction (percentage by weight, wt%) and mole fraction (percentage by moles, mol%) are others.

== Volume concentration and volume percent ==
Volume percent is the concentration of a certain solute, measured by volume, in a solution. It has as a denominator the volume of the mixture itself, as usual for expressions of concentration, rather than the total of all the individual components’ volumes prior to mixing:

$$\text{volume percent} = \frac\text{volume of solute}\text{volume of solution} \times 100% = \text{volume concentration} \times 100%.$$

Volume percent is usually used when the solution is made by mixing two fluids, such as liquids or gases. However, percentages are only additive for ideal gases.

The percentage by volume (vol%, % v/v) is one way of expressing the composition of a mixture with a dimensionless quantity; mass fraction (percentage by weight, wt%) and mole fraction (percentage by moles, mol%) are others.

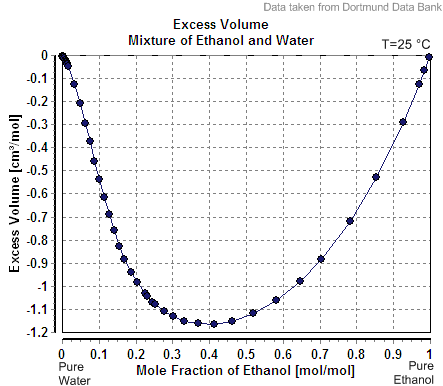
At room temperature, water-ethanol mixture loses volume at any mixing ratio.

In the case of a mixture of ethanol and water, which are miscible in all proportions, the designation of solvent and solute is arbitrary. The volume of such a mixture is slightly less than the sum of the volumes of the components. Thus, by the above definition, the term "40% alcohol by volume" refers to a mixture of 40 volume units of ethanol with enough water to make a final volume of 100 units, rather than a mixture of 40 units of ethanol with 60 units of water. The "enough water" is actually slightly more than 60 volume units, since water-ethanol mixture loses volume due to intermolecular attraction.

== Relation to mass fraction ==
Volume fraction is related to mass fraction,

$$w_i =\frac {m_i}{\sum_j m_j} = \frac {m_i}{m_{tot}}$$

by

$$w_i = \frac {\rho_i \varphi_i}{\sum_j{\rho_j \varphi_j}},  \rho _{i} = {\frac {m_{i}}{V_{i}}}$$

where $\rho_i$ is the constituent densities.

== See also ==
- Alcohol by volume
- Breathalyzer
- Alcohol proof
- Apparent molar property
- For non-ideal mixtures, see Partial molar volume and Excess molar quantity
- Percentage
- Mass fraction (chemistry)
