= Regular solution =

Simple model for non-ideal solutions

In chemistry, a regular solution is a solution whose entropy of mixing is equal to that of an ideal solution with the same composition, but is non-ideal due to a nonzero enthalpy of mixing. Such a solution is formed by random mixing of components of similar molar volume and without strong specific interactions, and its behavior diverges from that of an ideal solution by showing phase separation at intermediate compositions and temperatures (a miscibility gap). Its entropy of mixing is equal to that of an ideal solution with the same composition, due to random mixing without strong specific interactions. For two components

$$\Delta S_{mix} =  -nR(x_1\ln x_1 + x_2\ln x_2)\,$$

where $R\,$ is the gas constant, $n\,$ the total number of moles, and $x_i\,$ the mole fraction of each component. Only the enthalpy of mixing is non-zero, unlike for an ideal solution, while the volume of the solution equals the sum of volumes of components.

== Features ==
A regular solution can also be described by Raoult's law modified with a Margules function with only one parameter $\alpha$:

$$\ P_1= x_1P^*_1f_{1,M}\,$$
$$\ P_2= x_2P^*_2f_{2,M}\,$$

where the Margules function is

$$\ f_{1,M}= {\rm exp}(\alpha x_2^2)\,$$
$$\ f_{2,M}= {\rm exp}(\alpha x_1^2)\,$$

Notice that the Margules function for each component contains the mole fraction of the other component. It can also be shown using the Gibbs-Duhem relation that if the first Margules expression holds, then the other one must have the same shape. A regular solutions internal energy will vary during mixing or during process.

The value of $\alpha$ can be interpreted as W/RT, where W = 2U_{12} - U_{11} - U_{22} represents the difference in interaction energy between like and unlike neighbors.

In contrast to ideal solutions, regular solutions do possess a non-zero enthalpy of mixing, due to the W term. If the unlike interactions are more unfavorable than the like ones, we get competition between an entropy of mixing term that produces a minimum in the Gibbs free energy at x_{1} = 0.5 and the enthalpy term that has a maximum there. At high temperatures, the entropic term in the free energy of mixing dominates and the system is fully miscible, but at lower temperatures the G(x_{1}) curve will have two minima and a maximum in between. This results in phase separation. In general there will be a temperature where the three extremes coalesce and the system becomes fully miscible. This point is known as the upper critical solution temperature or the upper consolute temperature.

In contrast to ideal solutions, the volumes in the case of regular solutions are no longer strictly additive but must be calculated from partial molar volumes that are a function of x_{1}.

The term was introduced in 1927 by the American physical chemist Joel Henry Hildebrand.

== See also ==
- Solid solution
