= Molar volume =

Volume occupied by one mole of a substance

- Common symbols: V_{m}, $\tilde V$
- SI unit: m^{3}/mol
- Other units: dm^{3}/mol, cm^{3}/mol
- Dimension: L^{3} N^{−1}

In chemistry and related fields, the molar volume, symbol V_{m}, or $\tilde V$ of a substance is the quotient of the volume (V) occupied by a substance to the amount of substance (n), usually at a given temperature and pressure. It is also equal to the molar mass (M) divided by the mass density (ρ):
$$V_{\text{m}} = \frac{V}{n} = \frac{M}{\rho}$$

The molar volume has the SI unit of cubic metres per mole (m^{3}/mol), although it is more typical to use the units cubic decimetres per mole (dm^{3}/mol) for gases, and cubic centimetres per mole (cm^{3}/mol) for liquids and solids.

== Definition ==
Change in volume with increasing ethanol fraction.

The molar volume of a substance i is defined as its molar mass divided by its density ρ_{i}^{0}:
$$V_{\rm m,i} = {M_i\over\rho_i^0}$$
For an ideal mixture containing N components, the molar volume of the mixture is the weighted sum of the molar volumes of its individual components. For a real mixture the molar volume cannot be calculated without knowing the density:
$$V_{\rm m} = \frac{\displaystyle\sum_{i=1}^{N} x_i M_i}{\rho_{\mathrm{mixture}}}$$
There are many liquid–liquid mixtures, for instance mixing pure ethanol and pure water, which may experience contraction or expansion upon mixing. This effect is represented by the quantity excess volume of the mixture, an example of excess property.

=== Relation to specific volume ===
Molar volume is related to specific volume by the product with molar mass. This follows from above where the specific volume is the reciprocal of the density of a substance:
$$V_{\rm m,i} = {M_i \over \rho_i^0} = M_i v_i$$

== Ideal gases ==
For ideal gases, the molar volume is given by the ideal gas equation; this is a good approximation for many common gases at standard temperature and pressure. The ideal gas equation can be rearranged to give an expression for the molar volume of an ideal gas:
$$V_{\rm m} = \frac{V}{n} = \frac{RT}{P}$$
Hence, for a given temperature and pressure, the molar volume is the same for all ideal gases and is based on the gas constant: R = 8.31446261815324 m^{3}⋅Pa⋅K^{−1}⋅mol^{−1}, or about 8.20573660809596×10^{−5} m^{3}⋅atm⋅K^{−1}⋅mol^{−1}.

The molar volume of an ideal gas at 100 kPa (1 bar) is

0.022710954641485... m^{3}/mol at 0 °C,
0.024789570296023... m^{3}/mol at 25 °C.

The molar volume of an ideal gas at 1 atmosphere of pressure is

0.022413969545014... m^{3}/mol at 0 °C,
0.024465403697038... m^{3}/mol at 25 °C.

== Crystalline solids ==
For crystalline solids, the molar volume can be measured by X-ray crystallography. The unit cell volume (V_{cell}) may be calculated from the unit cell parameters, whose determination is the first step in an X-ray crystallography experiment (the calculation is performed automatically by the structure determination software). This is related to the molar volume by
$$V_{\rm m} = {{N_{\rm A}V_{\rm cell}}\over{Z}}$$
where N_{A} is the Avogadro constant and Z is the number of formula units in the unit cell. The result is normally reported as the "crystallographic density".

=== Molar volume of silicon ===
Ultra-pure silicon is routinely made for the electronics industry, and the measurement of the molar volume of silicon, both by X-ray crystallography and by the ratio of molar mass to mass density, has attracted much attention since the pioneering work at NIST in 1974. The interest stems from that accurate measurements of the unit cell volume, atomic weight and mass density of a pure crystalline solid provide a direct determination of the Avogadro constant.

The CODATA recommended value for the molar volume of silicon is 1.205883199(60)×10^{−5} m^{3}⋅mol^{−1}, with a relative standard uncertainty of 4.9×10^{−8}.

== See also ==
- Specific volume
- Standard temperature and pressure#Molar volume of a gas
