= Hydration energy =

Energy released by one mole of ions in a hydration reaction

In chemistry, hydration energy (also hydration enthalpy) is the amount of energy released when one mole of ions undergoes solvation. Hydration energy is one component in the quantitative analysis of solvation. It is a particular special case of water. The value of hydration energies is one of the most challenging aspects of structural prediction. Upon dissolving a salt in water, the cations and anions interact with the positive and negative dipoles of the water. The trade-off of these interactions vs those within the crystalline solid comprises the hydration energy.

== Examples ==
If the hydration energy is greater than the lattice energy, then the enthalpy of solution is negative (heat is released), otherwise it is positive (heat is absorbed).

The hydration energy should not be confused with solvation energy, which is the change in Gibbs free energy (not enthalpy) as solute in the gaseous state is dissolved. If the solvation energy is positive, then the solvation process is endergonic; otherwise, it is exergonic.

For instance, water warms when treated with CaCl_{2} (anhydrous calcium chloride) as a consequence of the large heat of hydration. However, the hexahydrate, CaCl_{2}·6H_{2}O cools the water upon dissolution. The latter happens because the hydration energy does not completely overcome the lattice energy, and the remainder has to be taken from the water in order to compensate the energy loss.

The hydration energies of the gaseous Li^{+}, Na^{+}, and Cs^{+} are respectively 520, 405, and 265 kJ/mol.

== See also ==
- Enthalpy of solution
- Heat of dilution
- Hydrate
- Hydrational fluid
- Ionization energy
