= Partial molar property =

Change in a property of a mixture component with respect to amount

In thermodynamics, a partial molar property is a quantity which describes the variation of an extensive property (such as volume) of a solution or mixture with changes in the molar composition of the mixture at constant temperature and pressure. It is the partial derivative of the extensive property with respect to the amount (expressed in number of moles) of the component of interest. Every extensive property of a mixture has a corresponding partial molar property. For example, the partial molar volume is broadly understood as the contribution that a component of a mixture makes to the overall volume of the solution.

== Discussion ==
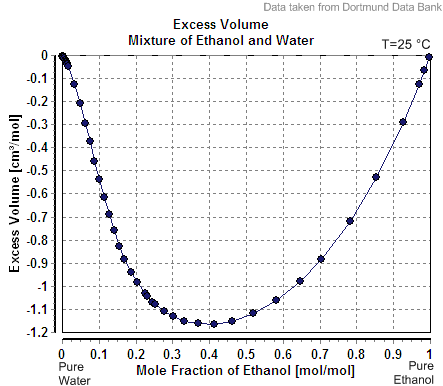
Water and ethanol always have negative excess volumes when mixed, indicating the partial molar volume of each component is less when mixed than its molar volume when pure.

When one mole of water is added to a large volume of water at 25 °C, the volume increases by 18 cm^{3}. The molar volume of pure water would thus be reported as 18 cm^{3} mol^{−1}. However, addition of one mole of water to a large volume of pure ethanol results in an increase in volume of only 14 cm^{3}. The reason that the increase is different is that the volume occupied by a given number of water molecules depends upon the identity of the surrounding molecules. The value 14 cm^{3} is said to be the partial molar volume of water in ethanol.

In general, the partial molar volume of a substance X in a mixture is the change in volume per mole of X added to the mixture.

The partial molar volumes of the components of a mixture vary with the composition of the mixture, because the environment of the molecules in the mixture changes with the composition. It is the changing molecular environment (and the consequent alteration of the interactions between molecules) that results in the thermodynamic properties of a mixture changing as its composition is altered.

If, by $Z$, one denotes a generic extensive property of a mixture, it will always be true that it depends on the pressure ($P$), temperature ($T$), and the amount of each component of the mixture (measured in moles, n). For a mixture with q components, this is expressed as

$$Z=Z(T,P,n_1,n_2,\cdots,n_q).$$

Now if temperature T and pressure P are held constant, $Z=Z(n_1,n_2,\cdots)$ is a homogeneous function of degree 1, since doubling the quantities of each component in the mixture will double $Z$. More generally, for any $\lambda$:

$$Z(\lambda n_1,\lambda n_2, \cdots,\lambda n_q)=\lambda Z(n_1,n_2,\cdots,n_q).$$

By Euler's first theorem for homogeneous functions, this implies

$$Z=\sum _{i=1}^q n_i \bar{Z_i},$$

where $\bar{Z_i}$ is the partial molar $Z$ of component $i$ defined as:

$$\bar{Z_i}=\left( \frac{\partial Z}{\partial n_i} \right)_{T,P,n_{j\neq i}}.$$

By Euler's second theorem for homogeneous functions, $\bar{Z_i}$ is a homogeneous function of degree 0 (i.e., $\bar{Z_i}$ is an intensive property) which means that for any $\lambda$:

$$\bar{Z_i}(\lambda n_1,\lambda n_2,\cdots ,\lambda n_q)=\bar{Z_i}(n_1,n_2,\cdots,n_q).$$

In particular, taking $\lambda = 1/n_T$ where $n_T=n_1+n_2+ \cdots$, one has

$$\bar{Z_i}(x_1,x_2, \cdots )=\bar{Z_i}(n_1,n_2,\cdots),$$

where $x_i=\frac{n_i}{n_T}$ is the concentration expressed as the mole fraction of component $i$. Since the molar fractions satisfy the relation

$$\sum _{i=1}^q x_i = 1,$$

the x_{i} are not independent, and the partial molar property is a function of only $q-1$ mole fractions:

$$\bar{Z_i}=\bar{Z_i}(x_1,x_2, \cdots , x_{q-1}).$$

The partial molar property is thus an intensive property - it does not depend on the size of the system.

The partial volume is not the partial molar volume.

== Applications ==
Partial molar properties are useful because chemical mixtures are often maintained at constant temperature and pressure and under these conditions, the value of any extensive property can be obtained from its partial molar property. They are especially useful when considering specific properties of pure substances (that is, properties of one mole of pure substance) and properties of mixing (such as the heat of mixing or entropy of mixing). By definition, properties of mixing are related to those of the pure substances by:

$$\Delta z^M=z-\sum_i x_iz^*_i.$$

Here $*$ denotes a pure substance, $M$ the mixing property, and $z$ corresponds to the specific property under consideration. From the definition of partial molar properties,

$$z=\sum_i x_i \bar{Z_i},$$

substitution yields:

$$\Delta z^M=\sum_i x_i(\bar{Z_i}-z_i^*).$$

So from knowledge of the partial molar properties, deviation of properties of mixing from single components can be calculated.

== Relationship to thermodynamic potentials ==
Partial molar properties satisfy relations analogous to those of the extensive properties. For the internal energy U, enthalpy H, Helmholtz free energy A, and Gibbs free energy G, the following hold:

$$\bar{H_i}=\bar{U_i}+P\bar{V_i},$$
$$\bar{A_i}=\bar{U_i}-T\bar{S_i},$$
$$\bar{G_i}=\bar{H_i}-T\bar{S_i},$$

where $P$ is the pressure, $V$ the volume, $T$ the temperature, and $S$ the entropy.

== Differential form of the thermodynamic potentials ==
The thermodynamic potentials also satisfy

$$dU= TdS-PdV+\sum_i \mu_i dn_i,\,$$
$$dH= TdS+VdP+\sum_i \mu_i dn_i,\,$$
$$dA=-SdT-PdV+\sum_i \mu_i dn_i,\,$$
$$dG=-SdT+VdP+\sum_i \mu_i dn_i,\,$$

where $\mu_i$ is the chemical potential defined as (for constant n_{j} with j≠i):

$$\mu_i=\left( \frac{\partial U}{\partial n_i}\right)_{S,V}=\left( \frac{\partial H}{\partial n_i}\right)_{S,P}=\left( \frac{\partial A}{\partial n_i}\right)_{T,V}=\left( \frac{\partial G}{\partial n_i}\right)_{T,P}.$$

This last partial derivative is the same as $\bar{G_i}$, the partial molar Gibbs free energy. This means that the partial molar Gibbs free energy and the chemical potential, one of the most important properties in thermodynamics and chemistry, are the same quantity. Under isobaric (constant P) and isothermal (constant T ) conditions, knowledge of the chemical potentials, $\mu_i(x_1,x_2,\cdots , x_m)$, yields every property of the mixture as they completely determine the Gibbs free energy.

== Measuring partial molar properties ==
To measure the partial molar property $\bar{Z_1}$ of a binary solution, one begins with the pure component denoted as $2$ and, keeping the temperature and pressure constant during the entire process, add small quantities of component $1$; measuring $Z$ after each addition. After sampling the compositions of interest one can fit a curve to the experimental data. This function will be $Z(n_1)$. Differentiating with respect to $n_1$ will give $\bar{Z_1}$. $\bar{Z_2}$ is then obtained from the relation:

$$Z=\bar{Z_1}n_1+\bar{Z_2}n_2.$$

== Relation to apparent molar quantities ==
The relation between partial molar properties and the apparent ones can be derived from the definition of the apparent quantities and of the molality.

$$\bar{V_1}={}^\phi\tilde{V}_1 + b \frac{\partial {}^\phi\tilde{V}_1}{\partial b}.$$

The relation holds also for multicomponent mixtures, just that in this case subscript i is required.

== See also ==
- Apparent molar property
- Ideal solution
- Excess molar quantity
- Partial specific volume
- Thermodynamic activity
