= Heat of dilution =

Enthalpy change from diluting a substance in solution

In thermochemistry, the heat of dilution, or enthalpy of dilution, refers to the enthalpy change associated with the dilution process of a component in a solution at a constant pressure. If the initial state of the component is a pure liquid (presuming the solution is liquid), the dilution process is equal to its dissolution process and the heat of dilution is the same as the heat of solution. Generally, the heat of dilution is normalized by the amount of the solution and its dimensional units are energy per unit mass or amount of substance, commonly expressed in the unit of kJ/mol (or J/mol).

== Definition ==
The heat of dilution can be defined from two perspectives: the differential heat and the integral heat.

The differential heat of dilution is viewed on a micro scale, which is associated with the process in which a small amount of solvent is added to a large quantity of solution. The molar differential heat of dilution is thus defined as the enthalpy change caused by adding a mole of solvent at a constant temperature and pressure to a very large amount of solution. Because of the small amount of addition, the concentration of dilute solution remains practically unchanged. Mathematically, the molar differential heat of dilution is denoted as:

$$\Delta_\text{dil}^{d} H = \left(\frac{\partial \Delta_\text{dil} H}{\partial \Delta n_i}\right)_{T,p,n_B}$$

where ∂∆n_{i} is the infinitesimal change or differential of mole number of the dilution.

The integral heat of dilution, however, is viewed on a macro scale. With respect to the integral heat, consider a process in which a certain amount of solution diluted from an initial concentration to a final concentration. The enthalpy change in this process, normalized by the mole number of solute, is evaluated as the molar integral heat of dilution. Mathematically, the molar integral heat of dilution is denoted as:

$$\Delta_\text{dil}^{i} H = \frac{\Delta_\text{dil} H}{n_B}$$

If the infinite amount of solvent is added to a solution with a known concentration of solute, the corresponding change of enthalpy is called as integral heat of dilution to infinite dilution.

The dilution between two concentrations of the solute is associated to an intermediary heat of dilution by mole of solute.

== Dilution and dissolution ==
The process of dissolution and the process of dilution are closely related to each other. In both processes, similar final statuses of solutions are reached. However, the initial statuses can be different. In a dissolution process, a solute is changed from a pure phase—solid, liquid, or gas—to a solution phase. If the pure phase of the solute is a solid or gas (presuming the solvent itself is liquid), the process can be seen in two stages: the phase change into a liquid, and the mixing of liquids. The dissolution process is generally expressed as:

$$\textrm{solute(s,l,g)} + \textrm{solvent(l)} \rightarrow \textrm{solute(l)} + \textrm{solvent(l)} \rightarrow \textrm{solute(sln)} + \textrm{solvent(sln)}$$

The notation "sln" stands for "solution", which represents a status of the solvent or solute being part of the solution.

In a dilution process, on the other hand, the solution is changed from one concentration to another, illustrated as:

$$\textrm{solute(sln}_1\textrm{)} + \textrm{solvent(sln}_1\textrm{)} \rightarrow \textrm{solute(sln}_2\textrm{)} + \textrm{solvent(sln}_2\textrm{)}$$

Consider an extreme condition for the dilution process. Let the initial status be the pure liquid. The dilution process is then described as:

$$\textrm{solute(l)} + \textrm{solvent(l)} \rightarrow \textrm{solute(sln)} + \textrm{solvent(sln)}$$

It is worth noting that this expression is just the second stage of the dissolution process. In other words, if both the solute to be dissolved and the initial "solution" to be diluted are liquids, the dissolution and the dilution processes are identical.

== Steps in dilution ==
Viewed from a microscopic perspective, the dissolution and dilution processes involve three steps of molecular interaction: the breaking of attraction between solute molecules (lattice energy), the breaking of attraction between solvent molecules, and the forming of attraction between a solute and a solvent molecule. If the solution is ideal, which means the solute and the solvent are identical in an interaction, then all the kinds of attraction mentioned above have the same value. As a result, the enthalpy change caused by breaking and forming attraction is canceled, and the dilution of an ideal solution causes no enthalpy change.

However, if the solute and solvent cannot be treated identically when considered in terms of molecular attraction, which makes the solution non-ideal, the net change of enthalpy is nonzero. In other words, the heat of dilution results from the non-ideality of the solution.

== Examples for acids ==
The integral heats of dilution to infinite dilution of some acids in aqueous solutions are shown in the following table.

$-\Delta_m H\text{(dil)}$ in kJ/mol at 25 °C
m	Dil. ratio	HF	HCl	HClO_{4}	HBr	HI	HNO_{3}	CH_{2}O_{2}	C_{2}H_{4}O_{4}
55.506	1.0		45.61		48.83		19.73	0.046	2.167
5.5506	10	13.66	5.841	-0.490	4.590	3.577	1.540	0.285	1.477
0.5551	100	13.22	1.234	0.050	0.983	0.736	0.502	0.184	0.423
0.0555	1000	12.42	0.427	0.259	0.385	0.351	0.318	0.121	0.272
0.00555	10000	8.912	0.142	0.126	0.130	0.121	0.130	0.105	0.243
0.000555	100000	3.766	0.042	0.042	0.038	0.038	0.046	0.054	0.209
0	∞	0	0	0	0	0	0	0	0
