= Mass fraction (chemistry) =

Fraction of one substance's mass to the mass of the total mixture

In chemistry, the mass fraction of a substance within a mixture is the ratio $w_i$ (alternatively denoted $Y_i$) of the mass $m_i$ of that substance to the total mass $m_\text{tot}$ of the mixture. Expressed as a formula, the mass fraction is:

$$w_i = \frac {m_i}{m_\text{tot}}.$$

Because the individual masses of the ingredients of a mixture sum to $m_\text{tot}$, their mass fractions sum to unity:

$$\sum_{i=1}^{n} w_i = 1.$$

Mass fraction can also be expressed, with a denominator of 100, as percentage by mass (in commercial contexts often called percentage by weight, abbreviated wt.%, % w/w or w/o; see mass versus weight). It is one way of expressing the composition of a mixture in a dimensionless size; mole fraction (percentage by moles, mol%) and volume fraction (percentage by volume, vol%) are others.

When the prevalences of interest are those of individual chemical elements, rather than of compounds or other substances, the term mass fraction can also refer to the ratio of the mass of an element to the total mass of a sample. In these contexts an alternative term is mass percent composition. The mass fraction of an element in a compound can be calculated from the compound's empirical formula or its chemical formula.

== Terminology ==
In thermal engineering, vapor quality is used for the mass fraction of vapor in the steam.

In alloys, especially those of noble metals, the term fineness is used for the mass fraction of the noble metal in the alloy.

== Properties ==
The mass fraction is independent of temperature.

== Related quantities ==
=== Mixing ratio ===
The mixing of two pure components can be expressed introducing the (mass) mixing ratio of them $r_m = \frac{m_2}{m_1}$. Then the mass fractions of the components will be

$$\begin{align}
w_1 &= \frac{1}{1 + r_m}, \\
w_2 &= \frac{r_m}{1 + r_m}.
\end{align}$$

The mass ratio equals the ratio of mass fractions of components:

$$\frac{m_2}{m_1} = \frac{w_2}{w_1}$$

due to division of both numerator and denominator by the sum of masses of components.

=== Mass concentration ===
The mass fraction of a component in a solution is the ratio of the mass concentration of that component ρ_{i} (density of that component in the mixture) to the density of solution $\rho$.

$$w_i = \frac{\rho_i}{\rho}.$$

=== Molar concentration ===
The relation to molar concentration is like that from above substituting the relation between mass and molar concentration:

$$w_i = \frac{\rho_i}{\rho} = \frac{c_i M_i}{\rho},$$

where $c_i$ is the molar concentration, and $M_i$ is the molar mass of the component $i$.

=== Mass percentage ===
Mass percentage is defined as the mass fraction multiplied by 100.

=== Mole fraction ===
The mole fraction $x_i$ can be calculated using the formula

$$x_i = \frac{w_i}{M_i} \bar{M},$$

where $M_i$ is the molar mass of the component $i$, and $\bar{M}$ is the average molar mass of the mixture.

Replacing the expression of the molar-mass products,

$$x_i = \frac{\frac{w_i}{M_i}}{\sum_j \frac{w_j}{M_j}}.$$

== Spatial variation and gradient ==
In a spatially non-uniform mixture, the mass fraction gradient gives rise to the phenomenon of diffusion.

== See also ==
- Mass-flux fraction
