= Mole fraction =

Proportion of a constituent in a mixture

mole fraction
- Other names: molar fraction, amount fraction, amount-of-substance fraction
- Common symbols: x
- SI unit: 1
- Other units: mol/mol

In chemistry, the mole fraction or molar fraction, also called mole proportion or molar proportion, is a quantity defined as the ratio between the amount of a constituent substance, n_{i} (expressed in unit of moles, symbol mol), and the total amount of all constituents in a mixture, n_{tot} (also expressed in moles):

$$x_i = \frac{n_i}{n_\mathrm{tot}}$$

It is denoted x_{i} (lowercase Roman letter x), sometimes χ_{i} (lowercase Greek letter chi). (For mixtures of gases, the letter y is recommended.)

It is a dimensionless quantity with dimension of $\mathsf{N}/\mathsf{N}$ and dimensionless unit of moles per mole (mol/mol or mol ⋅ mol^{−1}) or simply 1; metric prefixes may also be used (e.g., nmol/mol for 10^{−9}). When expressed in percent, it is known as the mole percent or molar percentage (unit symbol %, sometimes "mol%", equivalent to cmol/mol for 10^{−2}). The mole fraction is called amount fraction by the International Union of Pure and Applied Chemistry (IUPAC) and amount-of-substance fraction by the U.S. National Institute of Standards and Technology (NIST). This nomenclature is part of the International System of Quantities (ISQ), as standardized in ISO 80000-9, which deprecates "mole fraction" based on the unacceptability of mixing information with units when expressing the values of quantities.

The sum of all the mole fractions in a mixture is equal to 1:

$$\sum_{i=1}^{N} n_i = n_\mathrm{tot} ; \ \sum_{i=1}^{N} x_i = 1$$

Mole fraction is numerically identical to the number fraction, which is defined as the number of particles (molecules) of a constituent N_{i} divided by the total number of all molecules N_{tot}. Whereas mole fraction is a ratio of amounts to amounts (in units of moles per moles), molar concentration is a quotient of amount to volume (in units of moles per litre). Other ways of expressing the composition of a mixture as a dimensionless quantity are mass fraction and volume fraction.

== Properties ==
Mole fraction is used very frequently in the construction of phase diagrams. It has a number of advantages:

- it is not temperature dependent (as is molar concentration) and does not require knowledge of the densities of the phase(s) involved
- a mixture of known mole fraction can be prepared by weighing off the appropriate masses of the constituents
- the measure is symmetric: in the mole fractions x = 0.1 and x = 0.9, the roles of 'solvent' and 'solute' are reversed.
- In a mixture of ideal gases, the mole fraction can be expressed as the ratio of partial pressure to total pressure of the mixture
- In a ternary mixture one can express mole fractions of a component as functions of other components mole fraction and binary mole ratios:
  $$\begin{align}
x_1 &= \frac{1 - x_2}{1 + \frac{x_3}{x_1}} \\[2pt]
x_3 &= \frac{1 - x_2}{1 + \frac{x_1}{x_3}}
\end{align}$$

Differential quotients can be formed at constant ratios like those above:

$$\left(\frac{\partial x_1}{\partial x_2}\right)_{\frac{x_1}{x_3}} = -\frac{x_1}{1 - x_2}$$

or

$$\left(\frac{\partial x_3}{\partial x_2}\right)_{\frac{x_1}{x_3}} = -\frac{x_3}{1 - x_2}$$

The ratios X, Y, and Z of mole fractions can be written for ternary and multicomponent systems:

$$\begin{align}
X &= \frac{x_3}{x_1 + x_3} \\[2pt]
Y &= \frac{x_3}{x_2 + x_3} \\[2pt]
Z &= \frac{x_2}{x_1 + x_2}
\end{align}$$

These can be used for solving PDEs like:

$$\left(\frac{\partial\mu_2}{\partial n_1}\right)_{n_2, n_3} =
\left(\frac{\partial\mu_1}{\partial n_2}\right)_{n_1, n_3}$$

or

$$\left(\frac{\partial\mu_2}{\partial n_1}\right)_{n_2, n_3, n_4, \ldots, n_i} =
\left(\frac{\partial\mu_1}{\partial n_2}\right)_{n_1, n_3, n_4, \ldots, n_i}$$

This equality can be rearranged to have differential quotient of mole amounts or fractions on one side.

$$\left(\frac{\partial\mu_2}{\partial\mu_1}\right)_{n_2, n_3} =
-\left(\frac{\partial n_1}{\partial n_2}\right)_{\mu_1, n_3} =
-\left(\frac{\partial x_1}{\partial x_2}\right)_{\mu_1, n_3}$$

or

$$\left(\frac{\partial\mu_2}{\partial\mu_1}\right)_{n_2, n_3, n_4, \ldots, n_i} =
-\left(\frac{\partial n_1}{\partial n_2}\right)_{\mu_1, n_2, n_4, \ldots, n_i}$$

Mole amounts can be eliminated by forming ratios:

$$\left(\frac{\partial n_1}{{\partial n_2}}\right)_{n_3} =
\left(\frac{\partial\frac{n_1}{n_3}}{\partial\frac{n_2}{n_3}}\right)_{n_3} =
\left(\frac{\partial\frac{x_1}{x_3}}{\partial\frac{x_2}{x_3}}\right)_{n_3}$$

Thus the ratio of chemical potentials becomes:

$$\left(\frac{\partial\mu_2}{\partial\mu_1}\right)_{\frac{n_2}{n_3}} =
-\left(\frac{\partial\frac{x_1}{x_3}}{\partial\frac{x_2}{x_3}}\right)_{\mu_1}$$

Similarly the ratio for the multicomponents system becomes

$$\left(\frac{\partial\mu_2}{\partial\mu_1}\right)_{\frac{n_2}{n_3}, \frac{n_3}{n_4}, \ldots, \frac{n_{i-1}}{n_i}} =
-\left(\frac{\partial\frac{x_1}{x_3}}{\partial\frac{x_2}{x_3}}\right)_{\mu_1, \frac{n_3}{n_4}, \ldots, \frac{n_{i-1}}{n_i}}$$

== Related quantities ==
=== Mass fraction ===
The mass fraction w_{i} can be calculated using the formula

$$w_i = x_i \frac{M_i}{\bar{M}} = x_i \frac {M_i}{\sum_j x_j M_j}$$

where M_{i} is the molar mass of the component i and M̄ is the average molar mass of the mixture.

=== Molar mixing ratio ===
The mixing of two pure components can be expressed introducing the amount or molar mixing ratio of them $r_n = \frac{n_2}{n_1}$. Then the mole fractions of the components will be:

$$\begin{align}
x_1 &= \frac{1}{1 + r_n} \\[2pt]
x_2 &= \frac{r_n}{1 + r_n}
\end{align}$$

The amount ratio equals the ratio of mole fractions of components:

$$\frac{n_2}{n_1} = \frac{x_2}{x_1}$$

due to division of both numerator and denominator by the sum of molar amounts of components. This property has consequences for representations of phase diagrams using, for instance, ternary plots.

==== Mixing binary mixtures with a common component to form ternary mixtures ====
Mixing binary mixtures with a common component gives a ternary mixture with certain mixing ratios between the three components. These mixing ratios from the ternary and the corresponding mole fractions of the ternary mixture x_{1(123)}, x_{2(123)}, x_{3(123)} can be expressed as a function of several mixing ratios involved, the mixing ratios between the components of the binary mixtures and the mixing ratio of the binary mixtures to form the ternary one.

$$x_{1(123)} = \frac{n_{(12)} x_{1(12)} + n_{13} x_{1(13)}}{n_{(12)} + n_{(13)}}$$

=== Mole percentage ===
Multiplying mole fraction by 100 gives the mole percentage, also referred as amount/amount percent [abbreviated as (n/n)% or mol %].

=== Mass concentration ===
The conversion to and from mass concentration ρ_{i} is given by:

$$\begin{align}
x_i &= \frac{\rho_i}{\rho} \frac{\bar{M}}{M_i} \\[3pt]
\Leftrightarrow \rho_i &= x_i \rho \frac{M_i}{\bar{M}}
\end{align}$$

where M̄ is the average molar mass of the mixture.

=== Molar concentration ===
The conversion to molar concentration c_{i} is given by:

$$\begin{align}
c_i &= x_i c \\[3pt]
&= \frac{x_i\rho}{\bar{M}} = \frac{x_i\rho}{\sum_j x_j M_j}
\end{align}$$

where M̄ is the average molar mass of the solution, c is the total molar concentration and ρ is the density of the solution.

=== Mass and molar mass ===
The mole fraction can be calculated from the masses m_{i} and molar masses M_{i} of the components:

$$x_i = \frac{\frac{m_i}{M_i}}{\sum_j \frac{m_j}{M_j}}$$

== Spatial variation and gradient ==
In a spatially non-uniform mixture, the mole fraction gradient triggers the phenomenon of diffusion.
