= Juan J. de Pablo =

Mexican American chemical engineer

- Education: National Autonomous University of Mexico; University of California, Berkeley
- Scientific career
- Fields: Chemical engineering
- Workplaces: University of Chicago; University of Wisconsin, Madison
- Doctoral advisor: John Prausnitz

Juan J. de Pablo is a Mexican-American chemical engineer. He is the executive vice president of global science and technology at New York University.and the executive dean of the New York University Tandon School of Engineering. He assumed those posts on October 1, 2024. Prior to that, he was Liew Family professor in the Pritzker School of Molecular Engineering at the University of Chicago and was a senior scientist at Argonne National Laboratory.

== Education ==
De Pablo earned a bachelor's degree in chemical engineering from Universidad Nacional Autónoma de México. After completing his Ph.D. in chemical engineering from the University of California, Berkeley, under the advisement of John Prausnitz, De Pablo conducted his postdoctoral research at the Swiss Federal Institute of Technology in Zurich, Switzerland.

== Honors and awards ==
He was elected into the National Academy of Sciences in 2022, and was elected a member of the National Academy of Engineering in 2016 for design of macromolecular products and processes via scientific computation. He is also a fellow of the American Academy of Arts and Sciences, the American Physical Society and an honorary member of the Mexican Academy of Sciences. He is recipient of the AIChE Charles M.A. Stine Award for outstanding contributions to the field of materials science and engineering, the DuPont Medal for excellence in nutrition and health science, and the American Physical Society 2018 Polymer Physics prize. He holds over 20 patents on multiple technologies.
