= COSMOSPACE =

COSMOSPACE (COSMO Surface-Pair Activity Coefficient Equation) is an activity coefficient model in which the activity coefficient of the components in a liquid chemical mixture can be related through their molar fraction. It was initially developed as an implicit solution to COSMO-RS.

UNIQUAC is a first order approximation for the interactions in a fluid. This means that the local concentrations around the different types of molecules in a fluid mixture are taken independently from each other. This leads to an inconsistency, which gives systematic errors for strong interacting molecules. This inconsistency is solved in the COSMOSPACE model. This is achieved by applying a self-consistent partition sum description of the ensemble of molecule surfaces. Therefore, the COSMOSPACE model outperforms Uniquac in the description of vapor–liquid and liquid–liquid phase equilibria.

== See also ==
- (in English) UNIQUAC
- (in French) UNIQUAC
- (in French) COSMOSPACE
- Chemical equilibrium
- Chemical thermodynamics
- Fugacity
