= Max Margules =

Austrian meteorologist (1856-1920)

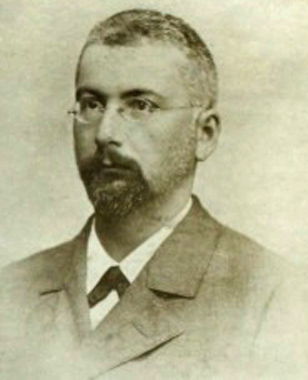
- Max Margules in 1920
- Born: 23 April 1856; Brody, Galicia, Austrian Empire
- Died: 4 October 1920 (aged 64); Perchtoldsdorf, Niederösterreich
- Education: University of Vienna
- Known for: Margules formula Margules activity model Duhem–Margules equation
- Awards: Hann Medal of Acknowledgement (1919)
- Scientific career
- Fields: Meteorology
- Workplaces: Austria ZAMG (Vienna); University of Vienna
- Academic advisors: Ludwig Boltzmann

Max Margules (April 23, 1856 – October 4, 1920) was an Austrian mathematician, physicist, and chemist.

Margules began his career in research in 1877, when he joined the Central Institute of Meteorology and Geodynamics (ZAMG) in Vienna as a volunteer. After two years, he left Vienna to study in Berlin for a year. He then returned to Vienna and received his PhD in Electrodynamics. During his doctoral studies, he was a Privatdozent, funded entirely by student fees.

However, when the administration offered him a teaching job, he refused to convert from Judaism to secure the position, which ended his academic career. In 1882, he returned to ZAMG. During this time he focused on electro- and hydrodynamic problems.

In his free time, he studied physical and physico-chemical problems. The Duhem–Margules equation and the Margules' Gibbs free energy equation are examples of his free-time devotion. In 1900 his interest switched to meteorology and where he found great success by deploying his thermodynamic knowledge. This led to the development of the Margules formula, a formula for characterizing the slope of a front. He dedicated his retirement to a new found interest in chemistry research, completely abandoning his meteorological studies.

In 1919 the Austrian Society for Meteorology awarded him the silver Hann Medal of Acknowledgement. Margules accepted the medal, but rejected the money. He rejected all attempts to make the last year of his life bearable. His small pension and the devaluation of the currency due to World War I led to a life in poverty. He contented himself with food coupons in the post World War I period. After a period of starvation, he developed hunger edema, which he refused to remedy and on the October 4, 1920 he died from starvation. His obituary noted that he was too proud to ask for assistance and that his death was a preventable tragedy.

Margules' accomplishments are seen as the theoretical pillars of meteorology and he left a lasting legacy on the field of thermodynamics in his name-sake equations.

== Publications ==
- Über die Schwingungen periodisch erwärmter Luft, in: Sbb. Wien, math. nat. Kl., Bd. 99, Abt. 2a, 1890
- Luftbewegungen in einer rotierenden Sphäroidschale bei zonaler Druckverteilung, ibid., Bd. 101/02, Abt. 2a, 1892–93
- Vergleichung der Barogramme von einigen Orten rings um Wien, in: Meteorolog. Z., Bd. 14, 1897
- Material zum Studium der Druckverteilung und des Windes in NÖ, in: Jhb. der k. k. Centralanstalt für Meteorol. und Erdmagnetismus in Wien, NF, Bd. 35, 1900; Bd. 37, 1902
- Temperaturstufen in NÖ im Winter 1898/99, ibid., Bd. 36, 1901
- Über den Arbeitswert einer Luftdruckverteilung und die Erhaltung der Druckunterschiede, in: Denkschriften Wien, math.-nat. Kl., Bd. 73, 1901
- Über rasche Erwärmungen, in: Meteorolog. Z., Bd. 20, 1903
- Über Temperaturschwankungen auf hohen Bergen, ibid., Bd. 20, 1903
- Über die Energie der Stürme, in: Jhb. der k. k. Centralanstalt für Meteorol. und Erdmagnetismus in Wien, NF, Bd. 42, 1905
- Über Temperaturschichtung in stationär bewegter und in ruhender Luft, in: Meteorolog. Z., Hann-Bd., 1906
- Über die Zusammensetzung der gesättigten Dämpfe von Mischungen. Sitzb. der math.-nat. Classe der kaiserlichen
- Akademie der Wissenschaften Wien 104, 1885
- Über die Änderung des vertikalen Temperaturgefälles durch Zusammendrückung oder Ausbreitung einer Luftmasse, ibid., Bd. 23, 1906
- Zur Sturmtheorie, ibid., Bd. 23, 1906; etc.

== Biography ==
- Österreichisches Biographisches Lexikon ÖBL, S. 84f
- Neue Deutsche Biographie NDB, Bd. 16, S. 169; Familienartikel, 170f
- Exner, W., Max Margules. In: Meteorologische Zeitschrift 37, 1920
- Gold, E., Dr. Max Margules. In: Nature, Vol. 106, Issue 2661, S. 286-287 (1920)
- In honor contribution of Max Margules to thermodynamics. Journal of Phase Equilibria and Diffusion, Vol. 17, Nr. 1 / January 1996. Springer, Boston
- "Max Margules—A Cocktail of Meteorology and Thermodynamics", Jaime Wisniak, Journal of Phase Equilibria Vol. 24 No. 2 2003, p103-109
