= John Prausnitz =

American chemical engineer (1928–2026)

John Michael Prausnitz
- Born: January 7, 1928; Berlin, Brandenburg, Prussia, Germany
- Died: November 5, 2026 (aged 98)
- Citizenship: American
- Education: Cornell University (B.Che.); University of Rochester (M.S.); Princeton University (Ph.D.)
- Known for: Molecular thermodynamics, NRTL, UNIQUAC, UNIFAC
- Children: Stephanie Prausnitz, Mark Prausnitz
- Awards: National Medal of Science (2003)
- Scientific career
- Fields: Chemical engineering
- Workplaces: University of California, Berkeley
- Doctoral advisor: Richard H. Wilhelm

John Michael Prausnitz (January 7, 1928 – November 5, 2026) was a professor of chemical engineering at the University of California, Berkeley.

Prausnitz was a member of the National Academy of Sciences and the National Academy of Engineering for contributions to the thermodynamics of phase equilibria and its application to industrial process design. In 2003, he received the National Medal of Science for his work in molecular thermodynamics. He developed many of the activity coefficient models used for the design of major chemical plants.

== Education ==
Prausnitz was born in Berlin, Germany, on January 7, 1928. His father and his mother's stepfather were both Jewish doctors. In 1933, when the Nazi Party rescinded the licenses of Jewish doctors, they were able to continue to work because they had been Frontkämpfer, "front fighters," during World War I.

In 1937, at age 9, Prausnitz emigrated with his parents and sister to the United States, where he had an uncle in Lynbrook, New York on Long Island. His father was able to practice medicine because his German medical license was recognized by the State of New York. Prausnitz lived briefly in Lynbrook, then in Manhattan, and Forest Hills, Queens. He attended Public School 101 in New York.

In 1950, Prausnitz earned his B.Ch.E., a five-year degree, from Cornell University. In 1951, he received his M.S. in chemical engineering from the University of Rochester. He then joined Princeton University as a student of Richard H. Wilhelm. He was able to spend two summers working at the Brookhaven National Laboratory. Prausnitz received his Ph.D. in chemical engineering from Princeton University in 1955 after completing a doctoral dissertation titled "Liquid-phase turbulent mixing properties."

== Career ==
Prausnitz joined the College of Chemistry at the University of California, Berkeley in 1955, attracted by the work of Joel Hildebrand on mixtures and by the opportunity to help shape what was then a young department. Although he officially retired from teaching in the Department of Chemical Engineering in 2004, Prausnitz remained a Faculty Senior Scientist at the Lawrence Berkeley National Laboratory and a Professor of the Graduate School at Berkeley.

Through his work on thermodynamics and phase behavior, Prausnitz developed the field of molecular thermodynamics, relating macroscopic properties to those of single- and multi-atom molecules. He initiated work on a number of important models for phase equilibria and the analysis of mixtures of solids, fluids, and gases, including the NRTL, UNIQUAC, and UNIFAC models. He was recognized for his engineering-oriented approach to molecular thermodynamics and its application to industrial process design.

During his career at Berkeley, Prausnitz published hundreds of scientific papers, monographs and books detailing his theoretical and experimental work. In 2011, the Journal of Chemical and Engineering Data published an issue as a Festschrift in his honor. At that time Prausnitz was credited with having published more than 760 articles, in 134 journals, with 421 different co-authors, from over twenty countries.

He was the founding editor of the Annual Review of Chemical and Biomolecular Engineering, working with it from 2008 to 2018. His books include Computer Calculations of Vapor−Liquid Equilibria (1967), the graduate textbook Molecular Thermodynamics of Fluid-Phase Equilibria (1969; 1986; 1999), and later editions of Regular and Related Solutions (1970) and The Properties of Gases and Liquids (1977; 1987; 2001).

Prausnitz was also a supporter of the Leonardo Project, an initiative to connect sciences with society, art, and philosophy, inspired by Jacob Bronowski and The Ascent of Man. The project developed and shared multidisciplinary case studies, primarily for use in undergraduate classes.

== Personal life and death ==
Prausnitz's son, Mark, is a professor at the Georgia Institute of Technology.

Prausnitz died on November 5, 2026, at the age of 98.

== Awards ==
Prausnitz was elected a member of the National Academy of Sciences in 1973 and the National Academy of Engineering in 1979 for contributions to the thermodynamics of phase equilibria and its application to industrial process design. He was elected to the American Academy of Arts and Sciences in 1988.

He was the recipient of many awards, from the Colburn Award of the American Institute of Chemical Engineers (AIChE) in 1962 to the National Medal of Science for his work in engineering-oriented molecular thermodynamics in 2003. In 2012, he received the Lifetime Achievement in Chemical Engineering Pedagogical Scholarship, given by the American Society for Engineering Education.

As of 2016, the American Institute of Chemical Engineers renamed the Institute Lecturer Award in his honor as the John M. Prausnitz AIChE Institute Lecturer Award.
