= Darken's equations =

Equations in physical chemistry

In metallurgy, the Darken equations are used to describe the solid-state diffusion of materials in binary solutions. They were first described by Lawrence Stamper Darken in 1948. The equations apply to cases where a solid solution's two components do not have the same coefficient of diffusion.

== The equations ==
Darken's first equation is:

$$\nu = (D_1 - D_2) \frac{\partial N_1}{\partial x} = (D_2 - D_1) \frac{\partial N_2}{\partial x}.$$

where:

- $\nu$ is the marker velocity of inert markers showing the diffusive flux.
- $D_1$ and $D_2$ are the diffusion coefficients of the two components.
- $N_1$ and $N_2$ are the atomic fractions of the two components.
- $x$ represents the direction in which the diffusion is measured.

This equation only holds in situations where the total concentration remains constant.

Darken's second equation is:

$$\tilde{D} = (N_1 D_2 + N_2 D_1) (1+N_1\frac{\partial \ln a_1}{\partial \ln N_1}).$$

where:

- $a_1$ is the activity coefficient of the first component.
- $\tilde{D}$ is the overall diffusivity of the binary solution.

== Experimental methods ==
In deriving the first equation, Darken referenced Simgelskas and Kirkendall's experiment, which tested the mechanisms and rates of diffusion and gave rise to the concept now known as the Kirkendall effect. For the experiment, inert molybdenum wires were placed at the interface between copper and brass components, and the motion of the markers was monitored. The experiment supported the concept that a concentration gradient in a binary alloy would result in the different components having different velocities in the solid solution. The experiment showed that in brass zinc had a faster relative velocity than copper, since the molybdenum wires moved farther into the brass. In establishing the coordinate axes to evaluate the derivation, Darken refers back to Smigelskas and Kirkendall’s experiment which the inert wires were designated as the origin.

In respect to the derivation of the second equation, Darken referenced W. A. Johnson’s experiment on a gold–silver system, which was performed to determine the chemical diffusivity. In this experiment radioactive gold and silver isotopes were used to measure the diffusivity of gold and silver, because it was assumed that the radioactive isotopes have relatively the same mobility as the non-radioactive elements. If the gold–silver solution is assumed to behave ideally, it would be expected the diffusivities would also be equivalent. Therefore, the overall diffusion coefficient of the system would be the average of each components diffusivity; however, this was found not to be true. This finding led Darken to analyze Johnson's experiment and derive the equation for chemical diffusivity of binary solutions.

== Darken's first equation ==
=== Background ===
As stated previously, Darken's first equation allows the calculation of the marker velocity $\nu$ in respect to a binary system where the two components have different diffusion coefficients. For this equation to be applicable, the analyzed system must have a constant concentration and can be modeled by the Boltzmann–Matano solution.

For the derivation, a hypothetical case is considered where two homogeneous binary alloy rods of two different compositions are in contact. The sides are protected, so that all of the diffusion occurs parallel to the length of the rod. In establishing the coordinate axes to evaluate the derivation, Darken sets the x-axis to be fixed at the far ends of the rods, and the origin at the initial position of the interface between the two rods. In addition this choice of a coordinate system allows the derivation to be simplified, whereas Smigelskas and Kirkendall's coordinate system was considered to be the non-optimal choice for this particular calculation as can be seen in the following section. At the initial planar interface between the rods, it is considered that there are infinitely small inert markers placed in a plane which is perpendicular to the length of the rods. Here, inert markers are defined to be a group of particles that are of a different elemental make-up from either of the diffusing components and move in the same fashion. For this derivation, the inert markers are assumed to be following the motion of the crystal lattice. The motion relative to the marker is associated with diffusion, $-D_1 \tfrac{\partial C_1}{\partial y}$, while the motion of the markers is associated with advection, $C_1\nu$. Fick’s first law, the previous equation stated for diffusion, describes the entirety of the system for only small distances from the origin, since at large distances advection needs to be accounted for. This results in the total rate of transport for the system being influenced by both factors, diffusion and advection.

=== Derivation ===
The derivation starts with Fick's first law using a uniform distance axis y as the coordinate system and having the origin fixed to the location of the markers. It is assumed that the markers move relative to the diffusion of one component and into one of the two initial rods, as was chosen in Kirkendall's experiment. In the following equation, which represents Fick's first law for one of the two components, D_{1} is the diffusion coefficient of component one, and C_{1} is the concentration of component one:

$$-D_1 \frac{\partial C_1}{\partial y}.$$

This coordinate system only works for short range from the origin because of the assumption that marker movement is indicative of diffusion alone, which is not true for long distances from the origin as stated before. The coordinate system is transformed using a Galilean transformation, y = x − νt, where x is the new coordinate system that is fixed to the ends of the two rods, ν is the marker velocity measured with respect to the x axis. The variable t, time, is assumed to be constant, so that the partial derivative of C_{1} with respect to y is equal to the partial of C_{1} with respect to x. This transformation then yields

$$-D_1 \frac{\partial C_1}{\partial x}.$$

The above equation, in terms of the variable x, only takes into account diffusion, so the term for the motion of the markers must also be included, since the frame of reference is no longer moving with the marker particles. In the equation below, $\nu$ is the velocity of the markers.

$$-\left[D_1\frac{\partial C_1}{\partial x} - C_1\nu\right].$$

Taking the above equation and then equating it to the accumulation rate in a volume results in the following equation. This result is similar to Fick's second law, but with an additional advection term:

$$\frac{\partial C_1}{\partial t} = \frac{\partial}{\partial x} \left[D_1 \frac{\partial C_1}{\partial x} - C_1 \nu\right].$$

The same equation can be written for the other component, designated as component two:

$$\frac{\partial C_2}{\partial t} = \frac{\partial}{\partial x} \left[D_2 \frac{\partial C_2}{\partial x} - C_2 \nu\right].$$

Using the assumption that C, the total concentration, is constant, C_{1} and C_{2} can be related in the following expression:

$$C = C_1 + C_2.$$

The above equation can then be used to combine the expressions for $\tfrac{\partial C_1}{\partial t}$ and $\tfrac{\partial C_2}{\partial t}$ to yield

$$\frac{\partial C}{\partial t} = \frac{\partial}{\partial x} \left[D_1 \frac{\partial C_1}{\partial x} + D_2 \frac{\partial C_2}{\partial x} - C \nu\right].$$

Since C is constant, the above equation can be written as

$$0 = \frac{\partial}{\partial x} \left[D_1 \frac{\partial C_1}{\partial x} + D_2 \frac{\partial C_2}{\partial x} - C \nu\right].$$

The above equation states that $\textstyle D_1 \frac{\partial C_1}{\partial x} + D_2\frac{\partial C_2}{\partial x} - C \nu$ is constant because the derivative of a constant is equal to zero. Therefore, by integrating the above equation it is transforms to $\textstyle D_1 \frac{\partial C_1}{\partial x} + D_2 \frac{\partial C_2}{\partial x} - C \nu = I$, where $I$ is an integration constant.

At relative infinite distances from the initial interface, the concentration gradients of each of the components and the marker velocity can be assumed to be equal to zero. Based on this condition and the choice for the coordinate axis, where the x axis fixed at the far ends of the rods, I is equal zero. These conditions then allow the equation to be rearranged to give

$$\nu = \frac{1}{C} \left[D_1 \frac{\partial C_1}{\partial x} + D_2 \frac{\partial C_2}{\partial x}\right].$$

Since C is assumed to be constant, $\textstyle \frac{\partial C_1}{\partial x} = -\frac{\partial C_2}{\partial x}$. Rewriting this equation in terms of atom fraction $N_1 = \tfrac{C_1}{C}$ and $N_2 = \tfrac{C_2}{C}$ yields

$$\nu = (D_1 - D_2) \frac{\partial N_1}{\partial x} = (D_2 - D_1) \frac{\partial N_2}{\partial x}.$$

=== Accompanying derivation ===
Referring back to the derivation for Darken's first equation, $\nu$ is written as

$$\nu = \frac{1}{C} \left[D_1 \frac{\partial C_1}{\partial x} + D_2 \frac{\partial C_2}{\partial x}\right].$$

Inserting this value for $\nu$ in $\textstyle \frac{\partial C}{\partial t} = \frac{\partial}{\partial x} \left[D_1 \frac{\partial C_1}{\partial x} - C_1 \nu\right]$ gives

$$\frac{\partial C_1}{\partial t} = \frac{\partial}{\partial x} \left[D_1 \frac{\partial C_1}{\partial x} - \frac{C_1}{C} \left[D_1 \frac{\partial C_1}{\partial x} + D_2\frac{\partial C_2}{\partial x}\right]\right].$$

As stated before, $\textstyle \frac{\partial C_1}{\partial x} = -\frac{\partial C_2}{\partial x}$, which gives

$$\frac{\partial C_1}{\partial t} = \frac{\partial}{\partial x} \left[\frac{C_1 + C_2}{C} D_1 \frac{\partial C_1}{\partial x} - \frac{C_1}{C} \left[D_1 \frac{\partial C_1}{\partial x} - D_2 \frac{\partial C_1}{\partial x}\right]\right].$$

Rewriting this equation in terms of atom fraction $N_1 = \tfrac{C_1}{C}$ and $N_2 = \tfrac{C_2}{C}$ yields

$$\frac{\partial N_1}{\partial t} = \frac{\partial}{\partial x} \left[(N_2 D_1 + N_1 D_2) \frac{\partial N_1}{\partial x}\right].$$

By using $\lambda \equiv \tfrac{x}{t^{1/2}}$ and solving to the form $N_1 = f(\lambda)$, it is found that

$$-\frac{1}{2} \lambda \,dN_1 = d[(N_2 D_1 + N_1 D_2) \frac{dN_1}{d\lambda}].$$

Integrating the above gives the final equation:

$$D = D_1 N_2 + D_2 N_1.$$

This equation is only applicable for binary systems that follow the equations of state and the Gibbs–Duhem equation. This equation, as well as Darken's first law, $\nu = (D_2 - D_1) \tfrac{\partial N_2}{\partial x}$, gives a complete description of an ideal binary diffusion system. This derivation was the approach taken by Darken in his original 1948, though shorter methods can be used to attain the same result.

== Darken's second equation ==
=== Background ===
Darken's second equation relates the chemical diffusion coefficient, $\tilde{D}$, of a binary system to the atomic fractions of the two components. Similar to the first equation, this equation is applicable when the system does not undergo a volume change. This equation also only applies to multicomponent systems, including binary systems, that obey the equations of state and the Gibbs–Duhem equations.

=== Derivation ===
To derive Darken's second equation the gradient in Gibb's chemical potential is analyzed. The gradient in potential energy, denoted by F_{2}, is the force which causes atoms to diffuse. To begin, the flux J is equated to the product of the differential of the gradient and the mobility B, which is defined as the diffusing atom's velocity per unit of applied force. In addition, N_{A} is the Avogadro constant, and C_{2} is the concentration of diffusing component two. This yields

$$J = -\frac{1}{N_A} \frac{dF_2}{dx} B_2 C_2,$$

which can be equated to the expression for Fick's first law:

$$-D_2 \frac{dC_2}{dx},$$

so that the expression can be written as

$$D_2 \frac{dC_2}{dx} = \frac{1}{N_\text{A}} \frac{dF_2}{dx} B_2 C_2.$$

After some rearrangement of variables the expression can be written for D_{2}, the diffusivity of component two:

$$D_2 = \frac{dF_2}{dC_2} \frac{B_2C_2}{N_\text{A}}.$$

Assuming that atomic volume is constant, so C = C_{1} + C_{2},

$$\frac{1}{N_\text{A}} \frac{dF_2}{dN_2} B_2 N_2.$$

Using a definition activity, $dF_2 = RT\,d\ln a_2$, where R is the gas constant, and T is the temperature, to rewrite the equation in terms of activity gives

$$D_2 = kT B_2 \frac{d\ln a_2}{d\ln N_2}.$$

The above equation can be rewritten in terms of the activity coefficient γ, which is defined in terms of activity by the equation $\gamma_2 = a_2/N_2$. This yields

$$D_2 = kT B_2 \left(1 + N_2 \frac{d\ln\gamma_2}{d\ln N_2}\right).$$

The same equation can also be written for the diffusivity of component one, $D_1 = kT B_1 \left(1 + N_1 \tfrac{d\ln\gamma_1}{d\ln N_1}\right)$, and combining the equations for D_{1} and D_{2} gives the final equation:

$$\tilde{D} = (N_1 D_2 + N_2 D_1) \frac{\partial \ln a_1}{\partial \ln N_1}.$$

== Applications ==
Darken’s equations can be applied to almost any scenario involving the diffusion of two different components that have different diffusion coefficients. This holds true except in situations where there is an accompanying volume change in the material because this violates one of Darken’s critical assumptions that atomic volume is constant. More complicated equations than presented must be used in cases where there is convection. One application in which Darken’s equations play an instrumental role is in analyzing the process of diffusion bonding. Diffusion bonding is used widely in manufacturing to connect two materials without using adhesives or welding techniques. Diffusion bonding works because atoms from both materials diffuse into the other material, resulting in a bond that is formed between the two materials. The diffusion of atoms between the two materials is achieved by placing the materials in contact with each other at high pressure and temperature, while not exceeding the melting temperature of either material. Darken’s equations, particularly Darken’s second equation, come into play when determining the diffusion coefficients for the two materials in the diffusion couple. Knowing the diffusion coefficients is necessary for predicting the flux of atoms between the two materials, which can then be used in numerical models of the diffusion bonding process, as, for example, was looked at in the paper by Orhan, Aksoy, and Eroglu when creating a model to determine the amount of time required to create a diffusion bond. In a similar manner, Darken’s equations were used in a paper by Watanabe et al., on the nickel-aluminum system, to verify the interdiffusion coefficients that were calculated for nickel aluminum alloys.

Application of Darken’s first equation has important implications for analyzing the structural integrity of materials. Darken’s first equation, $\textstyle v=(D_2-D_1)\frac{\partial N_2}{\partial x}$, can be rewritten in terms of vacancy flux, $\textstyle J_v=(D_2-D_1)\frac{\partial N_2}{\partial x}$. Use of Darken’s equation in this form has important implications for determining the flux of vacancies into a material undergoing diffusion bonding, which, due to the Kirkendall effect, could lead to porosity in the material and have an adverse effect on its strength. This is particularly important in materials such as aluminum nickel superalloys that are used in jet engines, where the structural integrity of the materials is extremely important. Porosity formation, known as Kirkendall porosity, in these nickel-aluminum superalloys have been observed when diffusion bonding has been used. It is important then to use Darken’s findings to predict this porosity formation.

== See also ==
- Gibbs-Duhem equation#Ternary and multicomponent solutions and mixtures
