= Lawrence Stamper Darken =

American psychical chemist and metallurgist (1909–1978)

- Born: September 18, 1909; New York City, U.S.
- Died: June 7, 1978 (aged 68); State College, Pennsylvania, U.S.
- Education: Hamilton College; Yale University
- Occupations: Physical chemist, metallurgist
- Known for: Darken's equations
- Scientific career
- Fields: Physical chemistry, metallurgy

Lawrence Stamper Darken (September 18, 1909 – June 7, 1978) was an American physical chemist and metallurgist, known for his two equations describing solid-state diffusion in binary solutions.

He earned his bachelor's degree in mathematics and chemistry from Hamilton College and attained his doctoral degree in physical chemistry at Yale University in 1933, followed by two postdoctoral years. From 1935 to 1971 Darken was employed at U.S. Steel Corporation Research Laboratory where he was director of the Edgar C. Bain Laboratory for Fundamental Research. After his retirement from U.S. Steel in 1971, he was appointed professor of mineral science at Pennsylvania State University.

In addition to his two equations on diffusion, Darken made contributions to the field with respect to chemical rate phenomena in liquid steel and slags, thermodynamics of metallic solutions, and phase equilibria in various ternary systems. He also wrote the textbook Physical chemistry of metals with R. W. Gurry.

In 1968 he received the R. W. Hunt Outstanding Paper Award from the Association for Iron and Steel Technology (AIST) for his papers Thermodynamics of Binary Metallic Solutions and Thermodynamics of Ternary Metallic Solutions. He was also awarded a Gold Medal from the American Society for Metals.

== See also ==
- Gibbs-Duhem equation#Ternary and multicomponent solutions and mixtures ("Lawrence Stamper Darken has shown ...")
