= Duhem–Margules equation =

Thermodynamic relation

The Duhem–Margules equation, named for Pierre Duhem and Max Margules, is a thermodynamic statement of the relationship between the two components of a single liquid where the vapour mixture is regarded as an ideal gas:

$$\left ( \frac{\mathrm{d}\ln P_A}{\mathrm{d}\ln x_A} \right )_{T,P} = \left ( \frac{\mathrm{d}\ln P_B}{\mathrm{d}\ln x_B} \right )_{T,P}$$

where P_{A} and P_{B} are the partial vapour pressures of the two constituents and x_{A} and x_{B} are the mole fractions of the liquid. The equation gives the relation between changes in mole fraction and partial pressure of the components.

== Derivation ==
Let us consider a binary liquid mixture of two component in equilibrium with their vapor at constant temperature and pressure. Then from the Gibbs–Duhem equation, we have

$n_A \mathrm{d} \mu_A + n_B \mathrm{d} \mu_B = 0$	1

Where n_{A} and n_{B} are number of moles of the component A and B while μ_{A} and μ_{B} are their chemical potentials.

Dividing equation (1) by n_{A} + n_{B}, then

$$\frac{n_A}{n_A+n_B} \mathrm{d}\mu_A + \frac{n_B}{n_A+n_B}\mathrm{d}\mu_B = 0$$

Or

$x_A \mathrm{d} \mu_A + x_B \mathrm{d} \mu_B = 0$	2

Now the chemical potential of any component in mixture is dependent upon temperature, pressure and the composition of the mixture. Hence if temperature and pressure are taken to be constant, the chemical potentials must satisfy

$\mathrm{d} \mu_A = \left( \frac{\mathrm{d}\mu_A}{\mathrm{d}x_A} \right)_{T,P}\mathrm{d}x_A$	3

$\mathrm{d} \mu_B = \left( \frac{\mathrm{d}\mu_B}{\mathrm{d}x_B} \right)_{T,P}\mathrm{d}x_B$	4

Putting these values in equation (2), then

$x_A \left( \frac{\mathrm{d}\mu_A}{\mathrm{d}x_A} \right)_{T,P}\mathrm{d}x_A + x_B \left( \frac{\mathrm{d}\mu_B}{\mathrm{d}x_B} \right)_{T,P}\mathrm{d}x_B = 0$	5

Because the sum of mole fractions of all components in the mixture is unity, i.e.,

$$x_1 + x_2 = 1$$

we have

$$\mathrm{d}x_1 + \mathrm{d}x_2 = 0$$

so equation (5) can be re-written:

$x_A \left( \frac{\mathrm{d}\mu_A}{\mathrm{d}x_A} \right)_{T,P} = x_B \left( \frac{\mathrm{d}\mu_B}{\mathrm{d}x_B} \right)_{T,P}$	6

Now the chemical potential of any component in mixture is such that

$$\mu = \mu_0 + RT \ln P$$

where P is the partial pressure of that component. By differentiating this equation with respect to the mole fraction of a component:

$$\frac{\mathrm{d}\mu}{\mathrm{d}x} = RT \frac{\mathrm{d} \ln P}{\mathrm{d}x}$$

we have for components A and B

$\frac{\mathrm{d}\mu_A}{\mathrm{d}x_A} = RT \frac{\mathrm{d} \ln P_A}{\mathrm{d}x_A}$	7

$\frac{\mathrm{d}\mu_B}{\mathrm{d}x_B} = RT \frac{\mathrm{d} \ln P_B}{\mathrm{d}x_B}$	8

Substituting these value in equation (6), then

$$x_A  \frac{\mathrm{d} \ln P_A}{\mathrm{d}x_A} = x_B  \frac{\mathrm{d} \ln P_B}{\mathrm{d}x_B}$$

or

$$\left ( \frac{\mathrm{d} \ln P_A}{\mathrm{d} \ln x_A} \right )_{T,P} = \left( \frac{\mathrm{d} \ln P_B}{\mathrm{d} \ln x_B} \right)_{T,P}$$

This final equation is the Duhem–Margules equation.

== Sources ==
- Atkins, Peter and Julio de Paula. 2002. Physical Chemistry, 7th ed. New York: W. H. Freeman and Co.
- Carter, Ashley H. 2001. Classical and Statistical Thermodynamics. Upper Saddle River: Prentice Hall.
