= COSMO-RS =

Approximate quantum chemistry model

COSMO-RS (short for "Conductor-like Screening Model for Real Solvents") is a quantum chemistry based equilibrium thermodynamics method with the purpose of predicting chemical potentials μ in liquids. It processes the screening charge density σ on the surface of molecules to calculate the chemical potential μ of each species in solution. Perhaps in dilute solution a constant potential must be considered. As an initial step a quantum chemical COSMO calculation for all molecules is performed and the results (e.g. the screening charge density) are stored in a database. In a separate step COSMO-RS uses the stored COSMO results to calculate the chemical potential of the molecules in a liquid solvent or mixture. The resulting chemical potentials are the basis for other thermodynamic equilibrium properties such as activity coefficients, solubility, partition coefficients, vapor pressure and free energy of solvation. The method was developed to provide a general prediction method with no need for system specific adjustment.

Due to the use of the screening charge density σ from COSMO calculations, COSMO-RS does not require functional group parameters. Quantum chemical effects like group-group interactions, mesomeric effects and inductive effects also are incorporated into COSMO-RS by this approach.

The COSMO-RS method was first published in 1995 by A. Klamt. A refined version of COSMO-RS was published in 1998 and is the basis for newer developments and reimplementations.

== Basic principles ==
The below description is a simplified overview of the COSMO-RS version published in 1998.

=== Assumptions ===
Screening charge density of water as calculated by the COSMO method.

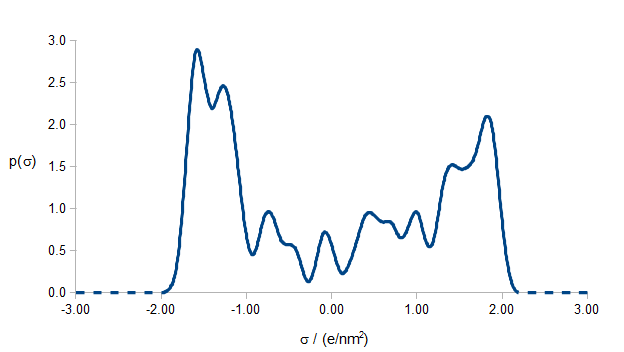
σ-profile of water; the basic input for COSMO-RS

1. The liquid state is incompressible
2. All parts of the molecular surfaces can be in contact with each other
3. Only pairwise interactions of molecular surface patches are allowed

As long as the above assumptions hold, the chemical potential μ in solution can be calculated from the interaction energies of pairwise surface contacts.

=== COSMO-RS equations ===
Within the basic formulation of COSMO-RS, interaction terms depend on the screening charge density σ. Each molecule and mixture can be represented by the histogram p(σ), the so-called σ-profile. The σ-profile of a mixture is the weighted sum of the profiles of all its components. Using the interaction energy E_{int}(σ,σ') and the σ-profile of the solvent p(σ'), the chemical potential μ_{s}(σ) of a surface piece with screening charge σ is determined as:

$\mu_s (\sigma)=-kT \ln \int p_s (\sigma') e^{- \frac{E_{int}(\sigma,\sigma')-\mu_s(\sigma')}{kT}} d\sigma'$

Due to the fact that μ_{s}(σ) is present on both sides of the equation, it needs to be solved iteratively. By combining the above equation with p^{x}(σ) for a solute x, and adding the σ-independent combinatorial and dispersive contributions, the chemical potential for a solute X in a solvent S results in:

$\mu^x_s =\mu^x_{comb}+E_{disp}+\int p^x (\sigma) \mu_s(\sigma) d\sigma$

In analogy to activity coefficient models used in chemical engineering, such as NRTL, UNIQUAC or UNIFAC, the final chemical potential can be split into a combinatorial and a residual (non ideal) contribution. The interaction energies E_{int}(σ,σ') of two surface pieces are the crucial part for the final performance of the method and different formulations are used within the various implementations. In addition to the liquid phase terms a chemical potential estimate for the ideal gas phase μ_{gas} has been added to COSMO-RS to enable the prediction of vapor pressure, free energy of solvation and related quantities.

=== Interaction energy (Residual) ===
The residual part is the sum of three different contributions, where E_{misfit} and E_{hb} are part of E_{int} and E_{disp} is added directly to the chemical potential.

==== Electrostatic interaction ====
$E_{misfit} (\sigma)=\frac{\alpha}{2}(\sigma+\sigma')^2$

In the E_{misfit} expression α is an adjustable parameter and σ and σ' refer to the screening charge densities of the two surface patches in contact. This term has been labeled "misfit" energy, because it results from the mismatch of the charged surface pieces in contact. It represents the Coulomb interaction relative to the state in a perfect conductor. A molecule in a perfect conductor (COSMO state) is perfectly shielded electronically; each charge on the molecular surface is shielded by a charge of the same size but of opposite sign. If the conductor is replaced by surface pieces of contacting molecules the screening of the surface will not be perfect any more. Hence an interaction energy from this misfit of σ on the surface patches will arise.

==== Hydrogen bonding energy ====
$E_{hb} (\sigma)=c_{hb}(T)\max[0,\sigma_{acc}-\sigma_{hb}] \min[0,\sigma_{don}+\sigma_{hb}]$

In the E_{hb} expression σ_{acc} and σ_{don} are the screening charge densities of the hydrogen bond acceptor and donor respectively. The hydrogen bonding threshold σ_{hb} and the prefactor c_{hb} are adjustable parameters. The max[] and min[] construction ensures that the screening charge densities of the acceptor and donor exceed the threshold for hydrogen bonding.

==== Dispersion (van der Waals energy) ====
$E_{disp} =\sum_k \gamma_k A_k$

The COSMO-RS dispersion energy of a solute depends on an element (k) specific prefactor γ and the amount of exposed surface A of this element. It is not part of the interaction energy but enters the chemical potential directly.

=== Parameters ===
Though the use of quantum chemistry reduces the need for adjustable parameters, some fitting to experimental data is inevitable. The basic parameters are α, c_{hb}, σ_{hb} as used in the interaction energies, and one general parameter for the effective contact area. In addition, one adjustable van der Waals parameter γ per element is required. All parameters either are general or element specific, which is a distinctive feature of COSMO-RS as compared to group contribution methods like UNIFAC.

== Implementations ==
The original streamline of COSMO-RS was continuously developed and extended by A. Klamt in his company COSMOlogic (now part of BIOVIA), and the most advanced software for COSMO-RS is the COSMOtherm software, now available from BIOVIA. They also offer a huge database (COSMObase) with more than 12000 COSMO files. COSMOtherm proved its prediction accuracy by delivering the most accurate physicochemical property predictions in the recent SAMPL5 and SAMPL6 challenges.

LVPP maintains an open sigma-profile database with COSMO-SAC ("Segment Activity Coefficient") parameterizations.

Gaussian (software) cannot compute σ-profiles, but can produce .cosmo input files for COSMO-RS/Cosmotherm via the keyword scrf=COSMORS.

SCM licenses a commercial COSMO-RS implementation in the Amsterdam Modeling Suite, which also includes COSMO-SAC, UNIFAC and QSPR models.

== See also ==
- UNIFAC
- UNIQUAC
- MOSCED
- NRTL
