= Margules activity model =

Thermodynamic model

The Margules activity model is a simple thermodynamic model for the excess Gibbs free energy of a liquid mixture introduced in 1895 by Max Margules. After Lewis had introduced the concept of the activity coefficient, the model could be used to derive an expression for the activity coefficients $\gamma_i$ of a compound i in a liquid, a measure for the deviation from ideal solubility, also known as Raoult's law.

In 1900, Jan Zawidzki proved the model via determining the composition of binary mixtures condensed at different temperatures by their refractive indices.

In chemical engineering, the Margules Gibbs free energy model for liquid mixtures is better known as the Margules activity or activity coefficient model. Although the model is old it has the characteristic feature to describe extrema in the activity coefficient, which modern models like NRTL and Wilson cannot.

== Equations ==
=== Excess Gibbs free energy ===
Margules expressed the intensive excess Gibbs free energy of a binary liquid mixture as a power series of the mole fractions x_{i}:

$$\frac{G^{ex}}{RT}=X_1 X_2 (A_{21} X_1 +A_{12} X_2) + X_1^2 X_2^2 (B_{21}X_1+ B_{12} X_2) + ... +  X_1^m X_2^m (M_{21}X_1+ M_{12} X_2)$$

In here the A, B are constants, which are derived from regressing experimental phase equilibria data. Frequently the B and higher order parameters are set to zero. The leading term $X_1X_2$ assures that the excess Gibbs energy becomes zero at x_{1}=0 and x_{1}=1.

=== Activity coefficient ===
The activity coefficient of component i is found by differentiation of the excess Gibbs energy towards x_{i}. This yields, when applied only to the first term and using the Gibbs–Duhem equation,:

$$\left\{\begin{matrix} \ln\ \gamma_1=[A_{12}+2(A_{21}-A_{12})x_1]x^2_2
\\ \ln\ \gamma_2=[A_{21}+2(A_{12}-A_{21})x_2]x^2_1
\end{matrix}\right.$$

In here A_{12} and A_{21} are constants which are equal to the logarithm of the limiting activity coefficients: $\ln\ ( \gamma_1^\infty)$ and $\ln\ (\gamma_2^\infty )$ respectively.

When $A_{12}=A_{21}=A$, which implies molecules of same molecular size but different polarity, the equations reduce to the one-parameter Margules activity model:

$$\left\{\begin{matrix} \ln\ \gamma_1=Ax^2_2
\\ \ln\ \gamma_2=Ax^2_1
\end{matrix}\right.$$

In that case the activity coefficients cross at x_{1}=0.5 and the limiting activity coefficients are equal. When A=0 the model reduces to the ideal solution, i.e. the activity of a compound is equal to its concentration (mole fraction).

=== Extrema ===
Using simple algebraic manipulation, it can be stated that $d \ln\gamma_1/dx_1$ increases or decreases monotonically within all $x_1$ range, if $A_{12} <0$ or $A_{21} >0$ with $0.5 < A_{12}/A_{21} < 2$, respectively. When $A_{12} < A_{21}/2$ and $A_{12} < 0$, the activity coefficient curve of component 1 shows a maximum and compound 2 minimum at:

$$x_1 = \frac{1-2A_{12}/A_{21}} {3(1-A_{12}/A_{21})}$$

Same expression can be used when $A_{12} < A_{21}/2$ and $A_{12} > 0$, but in this situation the activity coefficient curve of component 1 shows a minimum and compound 2 a maximum. It is easily seen that when A_{12}=0 and A_{21}>0 that a maximum in the activity coefficient of compound 1 exists at x_{1}=1/3. The coefficient of compound 2 goes at this concentration through a minimum as a result of the Gibbs-Duhem rule.

The binary system Chloroform(1)-Methanol(2) is an example of a system that shows a maximum in the activity coefficient of Chloroform. The parameters for a description at 20 °C are A_{12}=0.6298 and A_{21}=1.9522. This gives a minimum in the activity of Chloroform at x_{1}=0.17.

In general, for the case A=A_{12}=A_{21}, the larger parameter A, the more the binary systems deviates from Raoult's law; i.e. ideal solubility. When A>2 the system starts to demix in two liquids at 50/50 composition; i.e. plait point is at 50 mol%. Since:

$$A = \ln \gamma_1^\infty  = \ln \gamma_2^\infty$$

$$\gamma_1^\infty = \gamma_2^\infty > \exp(2) \approx 7.38$$

For asymmetric binary systems, A_{12}≠A_{21}, the liquid-liquid separation always occurs for

$$A_{21} + A_{12} > 4$$

Or equivalently:

$$\gamma_1^\infty  \gamma_2^\infty > \exp(4) \approx 54.6$$

The plait point is not located at 50 mol%. It depends on the ratio of the limiting activity coefficients.

=== Recommended values ===
An extensive range of recommended values for the Margules parameters can be found in the literature. Selected values are provided in the table below.

System	A_{12}	A_{21}
Acetone(1)-Chloroform(2)	-0.8404	-0.5610
Acetone(1)-Methanol(2)	0.6184	0.5788
Acetone(1)-Water(2)	2.0400	1.5461
Carbon tetrachloride(1)-Benzene (2)	0.0948	0.0922
Chloroform(1)-Methanol(2)	0.8320	1.7365
Ethanol(1)-Benzene(2)	1.8362	1.4717
Ethanol(1)-Water(2)	1.6022	0.7947

== See also ==
- Van Laar equation
