= UNIQUAC =

Model of phase equilibrium in statistical thermodynamics

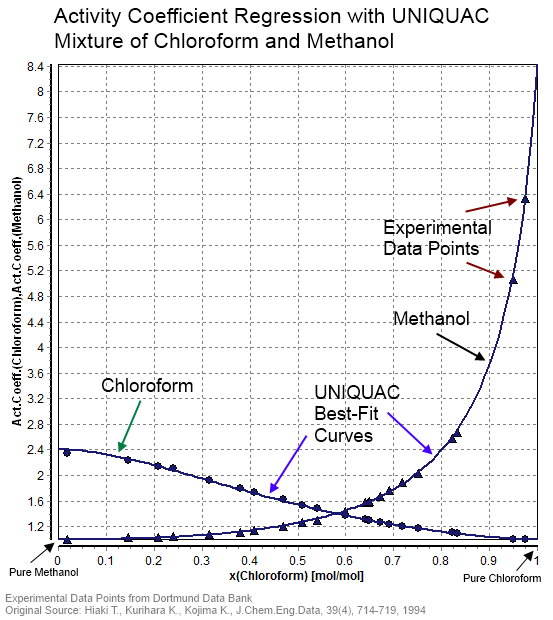
UNIQUAC regression of activity coefficients (chloroform/methanol mixture)

In statistical thermodynamics, UNIQUAC (a portmanteau of universal quasichemical) is an activity coefficient model used in description of phase equilibria. The model is a so-called lattice model and has been derived from a first order approximation of interacting molecule surfaces. The model is, however, not fully thermodynamically consistent due to its two-liquid mixture approach. In this approach the local concentration around one central molecule is assumed to be independent from the local composition around another type of molecule.

The UNIQUAC model can be considered a second generation activity coefficient because its expression for the excess Gibbs energy consists of an entropy term in addition to an enthalpy term. Earlier activity coefficient models such as the Wilson equation and the non-random two-liquid model (NRTL model) only consist of enthalpy terms.

Today the UNIQUAC model is frequently applied in the description of phase equilibria (i.e. liquid–solid, liquid–liquid or liquid–vapor equilibrium). The UNIQUAC model also serves as the basis of the development of the group contribution method UNIFAC, where molecules are subdivided into functional groups. In fact, UNIQUAC is equal to UNIFAC for mixtures of molecules, which are not subdivided; e.g. the binary systems water-methanol, methanol-acryonitrile and formaldehyde-DMF.

A more thermodynamically consistent form of UNIQUAC is given by the more recent COSMOSPACE and the equivalent GEQUAC model.

== Equations ==
Like most local composition models, UNIQUAC splits excess Gibbs free energy into a combinatorial and a residual contribution:

$$G^E = (G^E)^C + (G^E)^R$$

The calculated activity coefficients of the i^{th} component then split likewise:

$$\ln \gamma_i = \ln \gamma^C_i + \ln \gamma^R_i$$

The first is an entropic term quantifying the deviation from ideal solubility as a result of differences in molecule shape. The latter is an enthalpic (Note: Here it is assumed that the enthalpy change upon mixing can be assumed to be equal to the energy upon mixing, since the liquid excess molar volume is small and Δ H^{ex}=ΔU^{ex}+V^{ex} ΔP ≈ ΔU) correction caused by the change in interacting forces between different molecules upon mixing.

=== Combinatorial contribution ===
The combinatorial contribution accounts for shape differences between molecules and affects the entropy of the mixture and is based on the lattice theory. The Stavermann–Guggenheim equation is used to approximate this term from pure chemical parameters, using the relative Van der Waals volumes r_{i} and surface areas q_{i} (Note: It is assumed that all molecules have the same coordination number as the methylene group of an alkane, which is the reference to calculate the relative volume and surface area.) of the pure chemicals:

$$\frac{G^E}{RT} = \sum_i\, x_i \ln{V_i} + \frac {z}{2} q_i \, x_i \ln \frac{F_i}{V_i}$$

Differentiating yields the excess entropy γ^{C},

$$\ln \gamma_i^C = (1 - V_i + \ln V_i) - \frac{z}{2} q_i \left( 1 - \frac{V_i}{F_i} +
\ln \frac{V_i}{F_i}\right)$$

with the volume fraction per mixture mole fraction, V_{i}, for the i^{th} component given by:

$$V_i = \frac{r_i}{\sum_j x_j r_j}$$

The surface area fraction per mixture molar fraction, F_{i}, for the i^{th} component is given by:

$$F_i = \frac{ q_i}{\sum_j x_j q_j}$$

The first three terms on the right hand side of the combinatorial term form the Flory–Huggins contribution, while the remaining term, the Guggenhem–Staverman correction, reduce this because connecting segments cannot be placed in all direction in space. This spatial correction shifts the result of the Flory–Huggins term about 5% towards an ideal solution. The coordination number, z, i.e. the number of close interacting molecules around a central molecule, is frequently set to 10. It is based on the coordination number of an methylene group in a long chain, which has in the approximation of a hexagonal close packing structure of spheres 10 intermolecular and 2 bonds. (Note: By setting q_{I} and r_{i} to the value an infinite long chain, infinite times the value of the methylene group, one finds with Eqn. B3 of the original paper the limiting value z=10.)

In the case of infinite dilution for a binary mixture, the equations for the combinatorial contribution reduce to:

$$\begin{cases}
\ln \gamma_1^{C, \infty} = 1 - \dfrac{r_1}{r_2} + \ln \dfrac{r_1}{r_2} - \dfrac{z}{2} q_1 \left( 1 - \dfrac{r_1 q_2}{r_2 q_1} +\ln \dfrac{r_1 q_2}{r_2 q_1}\right) \\
\ln \gamma_2^{C,\infty} = 1 - \dfrac{r_2}{r_1} + \ln \dfrac{r_2}{r_1} - \dfrac{z}{2} q_2 \left( 1 - \dfrac{r_2 q_1}{r_1 q_2} +\ln \dfrac{r_2 q_1}{r_1 q_2}\right)
\end{cases}$$

This pair of equations show that molecules of same shape, i.e. same r and q parameters, have $\gamma_1^{C, \infty} = \gamma_2^{C, \infty}= 1$.

=== Residual contribution ===
The residual, enthalpic term contains an empirical parameter, $\tau_{ij}$, which is determined from the binary interaction energy parameters. The expression for the residual activity coefficient for molecule i is:

$$\ln \gamma_i^R = q_i \left( 1 - \ln \frac{\sum_j q_j x_j \tau_{ji} }{
\sum_j q_j x_j} - \sum_j {\frac{q_j x_j \tau_{ij}}{\sum_k q_k x_k \tau_{kj}}}
\right)$$

with

$$\tau_{ij} = e^{-\Delta u_{ij}/{RT}}$$

$\Delta u_{ii}$ [J/mol] is the binary interaction energy parameter. Theory defines $\Delta u_{ij} = u_{ij} - u_{ii}$, and $\Delta u_{ji} = u_{ji} - u_{jj}$, where $u_{ij}$ is the interaction energy between molecules $i$ and $j$. The interaction energy parameters are usually determined from activity coefficients, vapor-liquid, liquid-liquid, or liquid-solid equilibrium data.

Usually $\Delta u_{ij} \ne \Delta u_{ji}$, because the energies of evaporation (i.e. $u_{ii}$), are in many cases different, while the energy of interaction between molecule i and j is symmetric, and therefore $u_{ij} = u_{ji}$. If the interactions between the j molecules and i molecules is the same as between molecules i and j, there is no excess energy of mixing, $\Delta u_{ij} = \Delta u_{ji} = 0$. And thus $\gamma_i^{R} = 1$.

Alternatively, in some process simulation software $\tau_{ij}$ can be expressed as follows :

$$\ln \tau_{ij}  = A_{ij} + B_{ij}/T + C_{ij} \ln(T)+ D_{ij} T + E_{ij}/T^2$$.

The C, D, and E coefficients are primarily used in fitting liquid–liquid equilibria data (with D and E rarely used at that). The C coefficient is useful for vapor-liquid equilibria data as well. The use of such an expression ignores the fact that on a molecular level the energy, $\Delta u_{ij}$, is temperature independent. It is a correction to repair the simplifications, which were applied in the derivation of the model.

== Applications (phase equilibrium calculations) ==
Activity coefficients can be used to predict simple phase equilibria (vapour–liquid, liquid–liquid, solid–liquid), or to estimate other physical properties (e.g. viscosity of mixtures). Models such as UNIQUAC allow chemical engineers to predict the phase behavior of multicomponent chemical mixtures. They are commonly used in process simulation programs to calculate the mass balance in and around separation units.

== Parameters determination ==
UNIQUAC requires two basic underlying parameters: relative surface and volume fractions are chemical constants, which must be known for all chemicals (q_{i} and r_{i} parameters, respectively). Empirical parameters between components that describes the intermolecular behaviour. These parameters must be known for all binary pairs in the mixture. In a quaternary mixture there are six such parameters (1–2,1–3,1–4,2–3,2–4,3–4) and the number rapidly increases with additional chemical components. The empirical parameters are obtained by a correlation process from experimental equilibrium compositions or activity coefficients, or from phase diagrams, from which the activity coefficients themselves can be calculated. An alternative is to obtain activity coefficients with a method such as UNIFAC, and the UNIFAC parameters can then be simplified by fitting to obtain the UNIQUAC parameters. This method allows for the more rapid calculation of activity coefficients, rather than direct usage of the more complex method.

Remark that the determination of parameters from LLE data can be difficult depending on the complexity of the studied system. For this reason it is necessary to confirm the consistency of the obtained parameters in the whole range of compositions (including binary subsystems, experimental and calculated lie-lines, Hessian matrix, etc.).

=== Newer developments ===
UNIQUAC has been extended by several research groups. Some selected derivatives are: UNIFAC, a method which permits the volume, surface and in particular, the binary interaction parameters to be estimated. This eliminates the use of experimental data to calculate the UNIQUAC parameters, extensions for the estimation of activity coefficients for electrolytic mixtures, extensions for better describing the temperature dependence of activity coefficients, and solutions for specific molecular arrangements.

The DISQUAC model advances UNIFAC by replacing UNIFAC's semi-empirical group-contribution model with an extension of the consistent theory of Guggenheim's UNIQUAC. By adding a "dispersive" or "random-mixing physical" term, it better predicts mixtures of molecules with both polar and non-polar groups. However, separate calculation of the dispersive and quasi-chemical terms means the contact surfaces are not uniquely defined. The GEQUAC model advances DISQUAC slightly, by breaking polar groups into individual poles and merging the dispersive and quasi-chemical terms.

== See also ==
- Chemical equilibrium
- Chemical thermodynamics
- Fugacity
- MOSCED, a model for estimating limiting activity coefficients at infinite dilution
- NRTL, an alternative to UNIQUAC of the same local composition type
