= COSMO solvation model =

Computational model for solvent effects

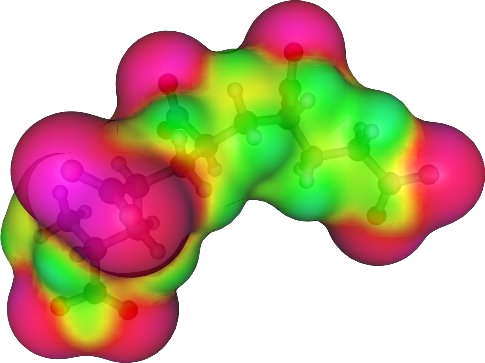
COSMO surface of a pentaacrylate molecule (red = negative, green = positive equilibrium layer).

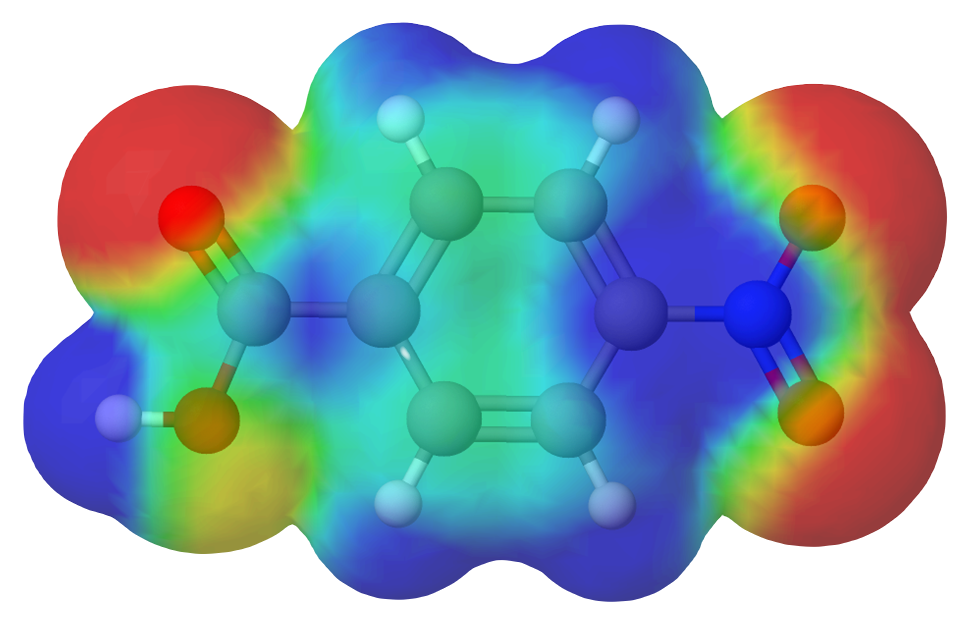
Charge density surface of 4-nitro-benzoicacid. Calculated with COSMO.

COSMO (COnductor-like Screening MOdel) is a calculation method for determining the electrostatic interaction of a molecule with a solvent. COSMO is a dielectric continuum model (a.k.a. continuum solvation model). These models can be used in computational chemistry to model solvation effects. COSMO has become a popular method of these solvation models in recent years. The COSMO formalism is similar to the method proposed earlier by Hoshi et al. The COSMO approach is based – as many other dielectric continuum models – on the surface segmentation of a molecule surface (usually referred to as 'solvent accessible surface' SAS approach).

Continuum solvation models – such as COSMO – treat each solvent as a continuum with a permittivity $\varepsilon$. Continuum solvation models approximate the solvent by a dielectric continuum, surrounding the solute molecules outside of a molecular cavity. In most cases it is constructed as an assembly of atom-centered spheres with radii approximately 20% larger than the Van der Waals radius. For the actual calculation the cavity surface is approximated by segments, e.g., hexagons, pentagons, or triangles.

Unlike other continuum solvation models, COSMO derives the polarization charges of the continuum, caused by the polarity of the solute, from a scaled-conductor approximation. If the solvent were an ideal conductor the electric potential on the cavity surface must disappear. If the distribution of the electric charge in the molecule is known, e.g. from quantum chemistry, then it is possible to calculate the charge $q^*$ on the surface segments. For solvents with finite dielectric constant this charge $q$ is lower by approximately a factor $f(\varepsilon)$:

$$q = f(\varepsilon) q^*.$$

The factor $f(\varepsilon)$ is approximately

$$f(\varepsilon)=\frac{\varepsilon-1}{\varepsilon+x},$$

where the value of $x$ should be set to 0.5 for neutral molecules and to 0.0 for ions, see original derivation. The value of $x$ is erroneously set to 0 in the popular C-PCM reimplementation of COSMO in Gaussian.

From the thus determined solvent charges $q$ and the known charge distribution of the molecule, the energy of the interaction between the solvent and the solute molecule can be calculated.

The COSMO method can be used for all methods in theoretical chemistry where the charge distribution of a molecule can be determined, for example semiempirical calculations, Hartree–Fock-method calculations or density functional theory (quantum physics) calculations.

== Workflow ==
COSMO calculations can be broken down into steps for better understanding:

1. Cavity construction and segmentation: Place a sphere of radius 20% larger than the Bondi radii around the atoms of the molecule and then smoothen the whole surface around the molecule using a certain solvent radius as the probe. This cavity Γ constructed around the molecule is then described as a set of m surface segments with positions t_{I} and areas s_{i}.
2. Boundary Condition: The screening charges on all the segments is determined by solving the following boundary condition: Aq^{*} = -Φ, where A is the Coulomb interaction matrix, q^{*} is the charge on the segments and Φ is the potential on each segment due to the solute. The final charge q is determined by scaling the charge q^{*} by a factor $f(\varepsilon)$ as previously mentioned.
3. Energy gain calculation: The energy gain of the system due to the polarization by solute is calculated as the half of the total electrostatic interaction energy of solute with the screening charges: qE_{tot.} = $\frac{1}{2}$Φq
4. SCF iterations for the screening charges: The screening charges are fed into the SCF step as external charges which modify the solute electron density and hence, repetition of step 2. This way the solute electron density and screening charges are iterated to self-consistency.

== Variants and implementations ==
COSMO has been implemented in a number of quantum chemistry or semi-empirical codes such as ADF, GAMESS-US, Gaussian, MOPAC, NWChem, TURBOMOLE, and Q-Chem. A COSMO version of the polarizable continuum model PCM has also been developed. Depending on the implementation, the details of the cavity construction and the used radii, the segments representing the molecule surface and the $x$ value for the dielectric scaling function $f(\varepsilon)$ may vary –which at times causes problems regarding the reproducibility of published results.

== Comparison with other methods ==
While models based on the multipole expansion of the charge distribution of a molecule are limited to small, quasi-spherical or ellipsoidal molecules, the COSMO method has the advantage (as many other dielectric continuum models) that it can be applied to large and irregularly formed molecular structures.

In contrast to the polarizable continuum model (PCM), which uses the exact dielectric boundary conditions, the COSMO method uses the approximative scaling function $f(\varepsilon)$. Though the scaling is an approximation, it turned out to provide a more accurate description of the so-called outlying charge, reducing the corresponding error. A method comparison of COSMO and the integral equation formalism PCM (IEFPCM), which combines the exact dielectric boundary conditions with a reduced outlying charge error, showed that the differences between the methods are small as compared to deviations to experimental solvation data. The errors introduced by treating a solvent as a continuum and thus neglecting effects like hydrogen bonding or reorientation are thus more relevant to reproduce experimental data than the details of the different continuum solvation methods.

== See also ==
- Polarizable continuum model
- COSMO-RS
