= UNIFAC =

Liquid equilibrium model in statistical thermodynamics

Saddle azeotrope calculated with UNIFAC at 1 atm. Red lines are vapor compositions and blue lines are liquid compositions. Image is rotating to more clearly show the saddle-like shape of the vapor–liquid equilibria

In statistical thermodynamics, the UNIFAC method (UNIQUAC Functional-group Activity Coefficients) is a semi-empirical system for the prediction of non-electrolyte activity in non-ideal mixtures. UNIFAC uses the functional groups present on the molecules that make up the liquid mixture to calculate activity coefficients. By using interactions for each of the functional groups present on the molecules, as well as some binary interaction coefficients, the activity of each of the solutions can be calculated. This information can be used to obtain information on liquid equilibria, which is useful in many thermodynamic calculations, such as chemical reactor design, and distillation calculations.

The UNIFAC model was first published in 1975 by Fredenslund, Jones and John Prausnitz, a group of chemical engineering researchers from the University of California. Subsequently, they and other authors have published a wide range of UNIFAC papers, extending the capabilities of the model; this has been by the development of new or revision of existing UNIFAC model parameters. UNIFAC is an attempt by these researchers to provide a flexible liquid equilibria model for wider use in chemistry, the chemical and process engineering disciplines.

== Introduction ==
A particular problem in the area of liquid-state thermodynamics is the sourcing of reliable thermodynamic constants. These constants are necessary for the successful prediction of the free energy state of the system; without this information it is impossible to model the equilibrium phases of the system.

Obtaining this free energy data is not a trivial problem, and requires careful experiments, such as calorimetry, to successfully measure the energy of the system. Even when this work is performed it is infeasible to attempt to conduct this work for every single possible class of chemicals, and the binary, or higher, mixtures thereof. To alleviate this problem, free energy prediction models, such as UNIFAC, are employed to predict the system's energy based on a few previously measured constants.

It is possible to calculate some of these parameters using ab initio methods like COSMO-RS, but results should be treated with caution, because ab initio predictions can be off. Similarly, UNIFAC can be off, and for both methods it is advisable to validate the energies obtained from these calculations experimentally.

== UNIFAC correlation ==
The UNIFAC correlation attempts to break down the problem of predicting interactions between molecules by describing molecular interactions based upon the functional groups attached to the molecule. This is done in order to reduce the sheer number of binary interactions that would be needed to be measured to predict the state of the system.

=== Chemical activity ===
The activity coefficient of the components in a system is a correction factor that accounts for deviations of real systems from that of an Ideal solution, which can either be measured via experiment or estimated from chemical models (such as UNIFAC). By adding a correction factor, known as the activity ($a_i$, the activity of the i^{th} component) to the liquid phase fraction of a liquid mixture, some of the effects of the real solution can be accounted for. The activity of a real chemical is a function of the thermodynamic state of the system, i.e. temperature and pressure.

Equipped with the activity coefficients and a knowledge of the constituents and their relative amounts, phenomena such as phase separation and vapour-liquid equilibria can be calculated. UNIFAC attempts to be a general model for the successful prediction of activity coefficients.

=== Model parameters ===
The UNIFAC model splits up the activity coefficient for each species in the system into two components; a combinatorial $\gamma^c$ and a residual component $\gamma^r$. For the $i$-th molecule, the activity coefficients are broken down as per the following equation:

$$\ln \gamma_i = \ln \gamma_i^c + \ln \gamma_i^r.$$

In the UNIFAC model, there are three main parameters required to determine the activity for each molecule in the system. Firstly there are the group surface area $Q$ and volume contributions $R$ obtained from the Van der Waals surface area and volumes. These parameters depend purely upon the individual functional groups on the host molecules. Finally there is the binary interaction parameter $\tau_{ij}$, which is related to the interaction energy $U_i$ of molecular pairs (equation in "residual" section). These parameters must be obtained either through experiments, via data fitting or molecular simulation.

==== Combinatorial ====
The combinatorial component of the activity is contributed to by several terms in its equation (below), and is the same as for the UNIQUAC model.

$$\ln \gamma_i^c = \ln \frac{\phi_i}{x_i} + \frac{z}{2} q_i \ln\frac{\theta_i}{\phi_i} + L_i - \frac{\phi_i}{x_i} \displaystyle\sum_{j=1}^{n} x_j L_j,$$

where $\theta_i$ and $\phi_i$ are the molar weighted segment and area fractional components for the $i$-th molecule in the total system and are defined by the following equation; $L_i$ is a compound parameter of $r$, $z$ and $q$. $z$ is the coordination number of the system, but the model is found to be relatively insensitive to its value and is frequently quoted as a constant having the value of 10.

$$\theta_i = \frac{x_i q_i}{\displaystyle\sum_{j=1}^{n} x_j q_j}, \quad \phi_i = \frac{x_i r_i}{\displaystyle\sum_{j=1}^{n} x_j r_j}, \quad L_i = \frac{z}{2}(r_i - q_i)-(r_i-1), \quad z=10,$$

$q_i$ and $r_i$ are calculated from the group surface area and volume contributions $Q$ and $R$ (Usually obtained via tabulated values) as well as the number of occurrences of the functional group on each molecule $\nu_k$ such that:

$$r_i = \displaystyle\sum_{k=1}^{n} \nu_k R_k, \quad q_i = \displaystyle\sum_{k=1}^{n}\nu_k Q_k.$$

==== Residual ====
The residual component of the activity $\gamma^{r}$ is due to interactions between groups present in the system, with the original paper referring to the concept of a "solution-of-groups". The residual component of the activity for the $i$-th molecule containing $n$ unique functional groups can be written as follows:

$$\ln \gamma_i^r = \displaystyle\sum_{k}^n \nu_k^{(i)} \left[ \ln \Gamma_k - \ln \Gamma_k^{(i)} \right],$$

where $\Gamma_k^{(i)}$ is the activity of an isolated group in a solution consisting only of molecules of type $i$. The formulation of the residual activity ensures that the condition for the limiting case of a single molecule in a pure component solution, the activity is equal to 1; as by the definition of $\Gamma_k^{(i)}$, one finds that $\ln \Gamma_k - \ln \Gamma_k^{(i)}$ will be zero. The following formula is used for both $\Gamma_k$ and $\Gamma_k^{(i)}$

$$\ln \Gamma_k = Q_k \left[1 - \ln \displaystyle\sum_m \Theta_m \Psi_{mk} - \displaystyle\sum_m \frac{\Theta_m \Psi_{km}}{\displaystyle\sum_n \Theta_n \Psi_{nm}}\right].$$

In this formula $\Theta_m$ is the summation of the area fraction of group $m$, over all the different groups and is somewhat similar in form, but not the same as $\theta_i$. $\Psi_{mn}$ is the group interaction parameter and is a measure of the interaction energy between groups. This is calculated using an Arrhenius equation (albeit with a pseudo-constant of value 1). $X_n$ is the group mole fraction, which is the number of groups $n$ in the solution divided by the total number of groups.

$$\Theta_m = \frac{Q_m X_m}{\displaystyle\sum_{n} Q_n X_n},$$

$$\Psi_{mn} = \exp \left[ -\frac{U_{mn} - U_{nm} }{RT} \right], \quad X_m = \frac{ \displaystyle\sum_j \nu^j_m x_j}{\displaystyle\sum_j \displaystyle\sum_n \nu_n^j x_j},$$

$U_{mn}$ is the energy of interaction between groups m and n, with SI units of joules per mole and R is the ideal gas constant. Note that it is not the case that $U_{mn} = U_{nm}$, giving rise to a non-reflexive parameter. The equation for the group interaction parameter can be simplified to the following:

$$\Psi_{mn} = \exp\frac{-a_{mn}}{T}.$$

Thus $a_{mn}$ still represents the net energy of interaction between groups $m$ and $n$, but has the somewhat unusual units of absolute temperature (SI kelvins). These interaction energy values are obtained from experimental data, and are usually tabulated.

== See also ==
- Chemical equilibrium
- Chemical thermodynamics
- Fugacity
- UNIQUAC – UNIversal QUasi-chemical Activity Coefficients
- UNIFAC Consortium
- PSRK – Predictive Soave–Redlich–Kwong
- MOSCED – Modified Separation of Cohesive Energy Density Model (Estimation of activity coefficients at infinite dilution)
