= MOSCED =

Thermodynamic model for the estimation of limiting activity coefficients

MOSCED (short for “modified separation of cohesive energy density" model) is a thermodynamic model for the estimation of limiting activity coefficients (also known as activity coefficient at infinite dilution). From a historical point of view MOSCED can be regarded as an improved modification of the Hansen method and the Hildebrand solubility model by adding higher interaction term such as polarity, induction and separation of hydrogen bonding terms. This allows the prediction of polar and associative compounds, which most solubility parameter models have been found to do poorly. In addition to making quantitative prediction, MOSCED can be used to understand fundamental molecular level interaction for intuitive solvent selection and formulation.

In addition to infinite dilution, MOSCED can be used to parameterize excess Gibbs Free Energy model such as NRTL, WILSON, Mod-UNIFAC to map out Vapor Liquid Equilibria of mixture. This was demonstrated briefly by Schriber and Eckert using infinite dilution data to parameterize WILSON equation.

The first publication is from 1984 and a major revision of parameters has been done 2005. This revised version is described here.

== Basic principle ==
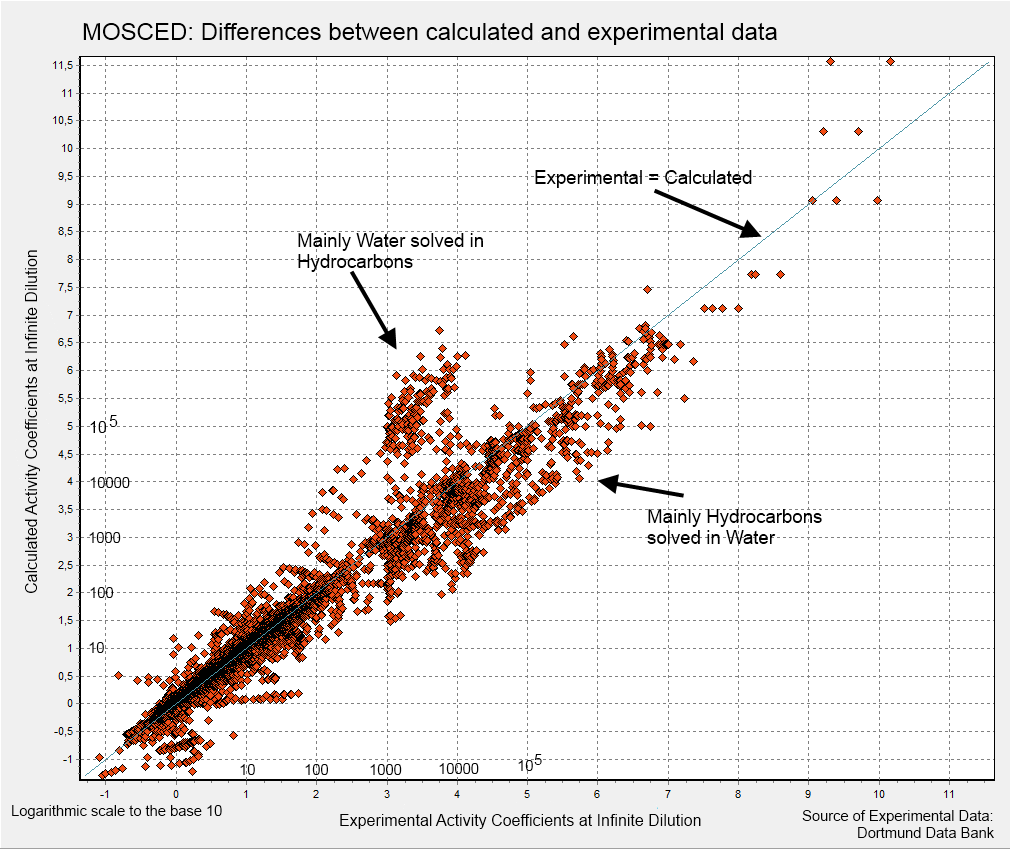
Deviations Chart

MOSCED uses component-specific parameters describing electronic properties of a compound. These five properties are partly derived from experimental values and partly fitted to experimental data. In addition to the five electronic properties the model uses the molar volume for every component.

These parameters are then entered in several equations to obtain the limiting activity coefficient of an infinitely diluted solute in a solvent. These equations have further parameters which have been found empirically.

The authors found an average absolute deviation of 10.6% against their database of experimental data. The database contains limiting activity coefficients of binary systems of non-polar, polar and hydrogen compounds, but no water. As can be seen in the deviation chart, the systems with water deviate significantly.

Due to such huge deviation of water as solute as seen in the chart, new water parameters are regressed to improve results. All the data for regression were taking from Yaws Handbook of Properties for Aqueous System. Using the old water parameter, for water in organics, Root Mean Square Deviation(RMSD) for ln (γ^{∞}) was found to be around 2.864% and Average Absolute Error(AAE) for (γ^{∞}) around 3056.2 %. That is a significant error which might explain the deviation as seen from the graph. With the new water parameters for water in organics, RMSD for ln (γ^{∞}) decreased to 0.771% and AAE for (γ^{∞}) also decreased to 63.2%. The revised water parameters can be found in the table below titled "Revised water".

== Equations ==
$$\ln \gamma_2^{\infty } =
\frac{\nu_2}{RT}
\left[
\left( \lambda_1 - \lambda_2 \right)^2 +
\frac{q_1^2 q_2^2 \left( \tau_1^T - \tau_2^T \right)^2}{\psi_1} +
\frac{\left( \alpha_1^T - \alpha_2^T \right) \left( \beta_1^T - \beta_2^T \right)}{\xi_1}
\right] + d_{12}$$

$$d_{12} = \ln \left( \frac{\nu_2}{\nu_1} \right)^{aa} + 1 - \left( \frac{\nu_2}{\nu_1} \right)^{aa}$$

$$aa = 0.953 - 0.002314 \left( \left( \tau_2^T \right)^2 + \alpha_2^T \beta_2^T \right)$$

$$\alpha^T = \alpha \left( \frac\text{293 K}{T} \right)^{0.8}$$,
$$\beta^T = \beta \left( \frac\text{293 K}{T} \right)^{0.8}$$,
$$\tau^T = \tau \left( \frac\text{293 K}{T} \right)^{0.4}$$

$$\psi_1 = \text{POL} + 0.002629 \alpha_1^T \beta_1^T$$

$$\xi_1 = 0.68 \left( \text{POL} - 1 \right) +
\left[3.4 - 2.4
\exp \left( -0.002687 \left( \alpha_1 \beta_1 \right)^{1.5} \right)
\right]^{\left( 293 K/T \right)^2}$$

$$\text{POL} = q_1^4 \left[ 1.15 - 1.15 \exp \left( -0.002337 \left( \tau_1^T\right)^3 \right) \right] + 1$$

with

Parameter	Description
ν	Molar liquid volume
λ	Dispersion parameter
q	Induction parameter
τ	Polarity parameter
α	Hydrogen-bond acidity parameter
β	Hydrogen-bond basicity parameter
ξ and ψ	Asymmetry factors
d_{12}	Combinatorial term (modified Flory-Huggins)
Index 1	Solvent
Index 2	Solute

Important note: The value 3.4 in the equation for ξ is different from the value 3.24 in the 2005 revision. The 3.24 has been verified to be a typing error.

The activity coefficient of the solute and solvent can be extended to other concentrations by applying the principle of the Margules equation. This gives:

$$\ln \gamma_2 = \left( \ln \gamma_2^\infty + 2 \left(  \ln \gamma_1^\infty - \ln \gamma_2^\infty \right)  \Phi_2 \right) \Phi_1^2$$

$$\ln \gamma_1 = \left( \ln \gamma_1^\infty + 2 \left(  \ln \gamma_2^\infty - \ln \gamma_1^\infty \right)  \Phi_1 \right) \Phi_2^2$$

where

$$\Phi_i= \frac{x_i \nu_i}{\sum_j \nu_j x_j}$$

is the volume fraction and $x_i$ the mole fraction of compound i. The activity coefficient of the solvent is calculated with same equations, but interchanging indices 1 and 2.

== Model parameters ==
The model uses five component specific properties to characterize the interaction forces between a solute and its solvent. Some of these properties are derived from other known component properties and some are fitted to experimental data obtained from data banks.

=== Liquid molar volume ===
The molar liquid volume ν is given in cm³/mol and assumed to be temperature-independent.

=== Dispersion parameter ===
The dispersion parameter λ describes the polarizability of a molecule.

=== Polarity parameter ===
The polarity parameter τ describes the fixed dipole of a molecule.

=== Induction parameter ===
The induction parameter q describes the effects of induced dipoles (induced by fixed dipoles). For structures with an aromatic ring the value is set to 0.9, for aliphatic rings and chains this value is set on 1. For some compounds the q-parameter is optimized between 0.9 and 1 (e.g. hexene, octene).

=== Acidity and basicity parameters ===
These parameters describe the effects of hydrogen-bonding during solving and association.

=== Parameter table ===
Name	ν	λ	τ	q	α	β
propane	75.7	13.10	0.00	1.00	0.00	0.00
1-phenyl-1-butanone	145.2	16.46	4.98	1.00	0.88	6.54
butane	96.5	13.70	0.00	1.00	0.00	0.00
acetophenone	117.4	16.16	6.50	0.90	1.71	7.12
pentane	116.0	14.40	0.00	1.00	0.00	0.00
epsilon-caprolactone	106.8	16.42	9.65	1.00	0.43	13.06
isopentane	117.1	13.87	0.00	1.00	0.00	0.00
dichloromethane	64.4	15.94	6.23	0.96	3.98	0.92
cyclopentane	94.6	16.55	0.00	1.00	0.00	0.00
chloroform	80.5	15.61	4.50	0.96	5.80	0.12
hexane	131.4	14.90	0.00	1.00	0.00	0.00
carbon tetrachloride	97.1	16.54	1.82	1.01	1.25	0.64
cyclohexane	108.9	16.74	0.00	1.00	0.00	0.00
1,1-dichloroethane	84.7	16.77	6.22	0.92	3.28	1.56
methylcyclopentane	113.0	16.10	0.00	1.00	0.00	0.00
1,2-dichloroethane	79.4	16.60	6.58	0.94	2.42	1.34
3-methylpentane	130.4	14.68	0.00	1.00	0.00	0.00
1,1,1-trichloroethane	100.3	16.54	3.15	1.01	1.05	0.85
2-methylpentane	132.9	14.40	0.00	1.00	0.00	0.00
trichloroethylene	90.1	17.19	2.96	1.00	2.07	0.21
2,3-dimethylbutane	131.2	14.30	0.00	1.00	0.00	0.00
1-chlorobutane	105.1	15.49	3.38	1.00	0.11	1.17
2,2-dimethylbutane	133.7	13.77	0.00	1.00	0.00	0.00
chlorobenzene	102.3	16.72	4.17	0.89	0.00	2.50
heptane	147.0	15.20	0.00	1.00	0.00	0.00
bromoethane	75.3	15.72	4.41	1.00	0.22	1.56
methylcyclohexane	128.2	16.06	0.00	1.00	0.00	0.00
bromobenzene	105.6	17.10	4.29	0.89	0.00	3.13
cycloheptane	121.7	17.20	0.00	1.00	0.00	0.00
iodomethane	62.7	19.13	4.21	1.00	1.16	0.83
3-methylhexane	146.4	14.95	0.00	1.00	0.00	0.00
diiodomethane	81.0	21.90	5.19	1.00	2.40	2.08
2,2-dimethylpentane	148.9	14.26	0.00	1.00	0.00	0.00
iodoethane	93.6	17.39	3.58	1.00	0.51	1.96
2,4-dimethylpentane	150.0	14.29	0.00	1.00	0.00	0.00
acetonitrile	52.9	13.78	11.51	1.00	3.49	8.98
2,3,4-trimethylpentane	159.5	14.94	0.00	1.00	0.00	0.00
propionitrile	70.9	14.95	9.82	1.00	1.08	6.83
octane	163.4	15.40	0.00	1.00	0.00	0.00
butyronitrile	87.9	14.95	8.27	1.00	0.00	8.57
2,2,4-trimethylpentane	165.5	14.08	0.00	1.00	0.00	0.00
benzonitrile	103.0	15.43	8.21	0.90	0.15	7.41
ethylcyclohexane	143.0	16.34	0.00	1.00	0.00	0.00
glutaronitrile	95.8	15.12	12.59	1.00	3.76	9.11
cyclooctane	134.9	17.41	0.00	1.00	0.00	0.00
nitromethane	54.1	13.48	12.44	1.00	4.07	4.01
2,5-dimethylhexane	165.6	14.74	0.00	1.00	0.00	0.00
nitroethane	72.0	14.68	9.96	1.00	1.19	4.72
nonane	179.6	15.60	0.00	1.00	0.00	0.00
1-nitropropane	89.5	15.17	8.62	1.00	0.28	5.83
decane	195.8	15.70	0.00	1.00	0.00	0.00
2-nitropropane	90.6	14.60	8.30	1.00	0.55	3.43
dodecane	228.6	16.00	0.00	1.00	0.00	0.00
nitrobenzene	102.7	16.06	8.23	0.90	0.98	3.29
tetradecane	261.3	16.10	0.00	1.00	0.00	0.00
dimethylformamide (DMF)	77.4	15.95	9.51	1.00	1.22	22.65
hexadecane	294.2	16.20	0.00	1.00	0.00	0.00
N,N-dibutylformamide	182.0	15.99	5.02	1.00	0.24	14.07
squalane	526.1	14.49	0.00	1.00	0.00	0.00
N,N-dimethylacetamide	93.0	15.86	9.46	1.00	0.00	21.00
1-pentene	110.3	14.64	0.25	0.90	0.00	0.24
N,N-diethylacetamide	124.5	15.66	6.71	1.00	0.25	18.67
1-hexene	125.8	15.23	0.22	0.93	0.00	0.29
N-methylformamide	59.1	15.55	8.92	1.00	8.07	22.01
1-octene	157.8	15.39	0.44	0.95	0.00	0.51
N-methylacetamide	76.9	16.22	5.90	1.00	5.28	23.58
α-pinene	159.0	17.32	0.15	0.95	0.00	1.30
N-ethylacetamide	94.3	16.07	4.91	1.00	4.14	22.45
benzene	89.5	16.71	3.95	0.90	0.63	2.24
aniline	91.6	16.51	9.41	0.90	6.51	6.34
toluene	106.7	16.61	3.22	0.90	0.57	2.23
2-pyrrolidone	76.8	16.72	11.36	1.00	2.39	27.59
p-xylene	123.9	16.06	2.70	0.90	0.27	1.87
N-methylpyrrolidone (NMP)	96.6	17.64	9.34	1.00	0.00	24.22
ethylbenzene	122.9	16.78	2.98	0.90	0.23	1.83
1-ethylpyrrolidin-2-one	114.1	16.74	8.31	1.00	0.00	20.75
isopropylbenzene	139.9	17.09	3.23	0.90	0.20	2.57
1,5-dimethyl-2-pyrrolidinone	115.2	16.50	8.45	1.00	0.00	22.66
butylbenzene	156.6	17.10	2.51	0.90	0.10	1.83
N-formylmorpholine	100.6	16.10	10.91	1.00	2.42	19.29
methanol	40.6	14.43	3.77	1.00	17.43	14.49
pyridine	80.9	16.39	6.13	0.90	1.61	14.93
ethanol	58.6	14.37	2.53	1.00	12.58	13.29
2,6-dimethylpyridine	116.7	15.95	4.16	0.90	0.73	13.12
1-propanol	75.1	14.93	1.39	1.00	11.97	10.35
quinoline	118.5	16.84	5.96	0.90	2.17	12.10
2-propanol	76.8	13.95	1.95	1.00	9.23	11.86
sulfolane	95.3	16.49	12.16	1.00	1.36	13.52
1-butanol	92.0	14.82	1.86	1.00	8.44	11.01
dimethyl sulfoxide (DMSO)	71.3	16.12	13.36	1.00	0.00	26.17
2-butanol	92.0	14.50	1.56	1.00	8.03	10.21
dioxane	85.7	16.96	6.72	1.00	0.00	10.39
2-methyl-2-propanol	94.7	14.47	2.55	1.00	5.80	11.93
tetrahydrofuran	81.9	15.78	4.41	1.00	0.00	10.43
2-methyl-1-propanol	92.9	14.19	1.85	1.00	8.30	10.52
diethyl ether	104.7	13.96	2.79	1.00	0.00	6.61
1-pentanol	108.5	15.25	1.46	1.00	8.10	9.51
dipropyl ether	137.6	15.20	2.00	1.00	0.00	5.25
1-hexanol	125.2	15.02	1.27	1.00	7.56	9.20
dibutyl ether	170.4	15.13	1.73	1.00	0.00	5.29
1-octanol	158.2	15.08	1.31	1.00	4.22	9.35
diisopropyl ether	141.8	14.72	1.90	1.00	0.00	6.39
phenol	88.9	16.66	4.50	0.90	25.14	5.35
methyl tert-butyl ether	119.9	15.17	2.48	1.00	0.00	7.40
benzyl alcohol	103.8	16.56	5.03	1.00	15.01	6.69
anisole	109.2	16.54	5.63	0.90	0.75	3.93
3-methylphenol (m-cresol)	105.0	17.86	4.16	0.90	27.15	2.17
tetraethylene glycol dimethyl ether	221.1	16.08	6.73	1.00	0.00	13.53
2-ethoxyethanol	97.3	15.12	7.39	1.00	3.77	16.84
acetic acid	57.6	14.96	3.23	1.00	24.03	7.50
methyl acetate	79.8	13.59	7.54	1.00	0.00	8.38
dimethyl carbonate	84.7	17.81	8.05	1.00	0.00	7.32
ethyl acetate	98.6	14.51	5.74	1.00	0.00	7.25
acetaldehyde	56.5	13.76	8.48	1.00	0.00	6.50
propyl acetate	115.8	13.98	5.45	1.00	0.00	7.53
butanal	90.4	15.11	5.97	1.00	0.00	5.27
butyl acetate	132.0	15.22	4.16	1.00	0.00	6.40
carbon disulfide	60.6	19.67	1.04	1.00	0.59	0.33
benzyl acetate	142.9	16.17	6.84	0.90	0.54	5.53
triethylamine	139.7	14.49	1.02	1.00	0.00	7.70
methyl formate	62.1	18.79	8.29	1.00	0.37	8.62
tributyl phosphate	345.0	15.05	4.87	1.00	0.00	14.06
ethyl benzoate	144.1	16.48	4.97	1.00	0.28	2.40
water	36.0	10.58	10.48	1.00	52.78	15.86
diethyl phthalate	199.7	16.33	6.14	1.00	1.07	7.81
argon	57.1	9.84	0	1.0	0	0
acetone	73.8	13.71	8.30	1.00	0.00	11.14
oxygen	52.9	8.84	0	1.0	0	0
2-butanone	90.2	14.74	6.64	1.00	0.00	9.70
nitrogen	50.0	7.48	0	1.0	0	0
2-pentanone	107.3	15.07	5.49	1.00	0.00	8.09
carbon monoxide	49.0	8.15	0	1.0	0	0
cyclohexanone	104.1	15.80	6.40	1.00	0.00	10.71
carbon dioxide	42.2	8.72	5.68	1.0	1.87	0
4-methyl-2-pentanone	125.8	15.27	4.71	1.00	0.00	6.34
$\ce{[emin][(CF3SO2)2N]}$	258.6	15.18	10.72	0.9	9.79	4.75
2-heptanone	140.7	14.72	4.20	1.00	0.00	6.08
Revised Water	26.60	6.53	14.49	1.00	45.34	12.81
$\ce{[emmin][(CF3SO2)2N]}$	275.9	15.25	10.83	0.9	7.20	5.11
