= Wong–Sandler mixing rule =

The Wong–Sandler mixing rule is a thermodynamic mixing rule used for vapor–liquid equilibrium and liquid-liquid equilibrium calculations.

== Summary ==
The first boundary condition is

$$b - \frac a {RT} = \sum_i \sum_j x_i x_j \left(b_{ij} - \frac{a_{ij}}{RT} \right)$$

which constrains the sum of a and b. The second equation is

$$\underline A^{ex}_{EOS}(T, P\to\infty, \underline x) = \underline A^{ex}_{\gamma}(T, P\to\infty, \underline x)$$

with the notable limit as $P\to \infty$ (and $\underline{V}_i\to b,$ $\underline{V}_{mix}\to b$) of

$$\underline A^{ex}_{EOS} = C^* \left(\frac a b - \sum x_i \frac{a_i}{b_i} \right).$$

The mixing rules become

$$\frac{a}{RT} = Q \frac{D}{1-D},\quad b = \frac{Q}{1-D}$$

$$Q = \sum_i \sum_j x_i x_j \left( b_{ij} - \frac{a_{ij}}{RT} \right)$$

$$D = \sum_i x_i \frac{a_i}{b_i RT} + \frac{ \underline{G}^{ex}_\gamma(T, P, \underline x) }{C^* RT}$$

The cross term still must be specified by a combining rule, either

$$b_{ij} - \frac{a_{ij}}{RT} = \sqrt{\left(b_{ii} - \frac{a_{ii}}{RT}\right)\left(b_{jj} - \frac{a_{jj}}{RT}\right)} (1 - k_{ij})$$

or

$$b_{ij} - \frac{a_{ij}}{RT} = \frac{1}{2}(b_{ii} + b_{jj}) - \frac{\sqrt{a_{ii}a_{jj}}}{RT}(1 - k_{ij}).$$

== See also ==
Vapor–liquid equilibrium
Equation of state
