= Temperature-responsive polymer =

Polymer showing drastic changes in physical properties with temperature

Temperature-responsive polymers or thermoresponsive polymers are polymers that exhibit drastic and discontinuous changes in their physical properties with temperature. The term is commonly used when the property concerned is solubility in a given solvent, but it may also be used when other properties are affected. Thermoresponsive polymers belong to the class of stimuli-responsive materials, in contrast to temperature-sensitive (for short, thermosensitive) materials, which change their properties continuously with environmental conditions. In a stricter sense, thermoresponsive polymers display a miscibility gap in their temperature-composition diagram. Depending on whether the miscibility gap is found at high or low temperatures, either an upper critical solution temperature (UCST) or a lower critical solution temperature (LCST) exists.

Research mainly focuses on polymers that show thermoresponsivity in aqueous solution. Promising areas of application are tissue engineering, liquid chromatography, drug delivery and bioseparation. Only a few commercial applications exist, for example, cell culture plates coated with an LCST-polymer.

Thermoresponsive behavior of a polymer with LCST; top: coil-to-globule transition in solution; bottom: attached to a surface

== History ==
The theory of thermoresponsive polymer (similarly, microgels) begins in the 1940s with work from Flory and Huggins who both independently produced similar theoretical expectations for polymer in solution with varying temperature.

The effects of external stimuli on particular polymers were investigated in the 1960s by Heskins and Guillet. They established 32°C as the lower critical solution temperature (LCST) for poly(N-isopropylacrylamide). While PNIPA was synthesised soon after the synthesis of acrylamide monomer, its first patented use was as a rodent repellent.

== Coil-globule transition ==
Thermoresponsive polymer chains in solution adopt an expanded coil conformation. At the phase separation temperature they collapse to form compact globuli. This process can be observed directly by methods of static and dynamic light scattering. The drop in viscosity can be indirectly observed. When mechanisms which reduce surface tension are absent, the globules aggregate, subsequently causing turbidity and the formation of visible particles.

== Phase diagrams of thermoresponsive polymers ==
Phase diagram for UCST polymer blend.

The phase separation temperature (and hence, the cloud point) is dependent on polymer concentration. Therefore, temperature-composition diagrams are used to display thermoresponsive behavior over a wide range of concentrations. Phases separate into a polymer-poor and a polymer-rich phase. In strictly binary mixtures the composition of the coexisting phases can be determined by drawing tie-lines. However, since polymers display a molar mass distribution this straightforward approach may be insufficient.

During the process of phase separation the polymer-rich phase can vitrify before equilibrium is reached. This depends on the glass transition temperature for each individual composition. It is convenient to add the glass transition curve to the phase diagram, although it is no real equilibrium. The intersection of the glass transition curve with the cloud point curve is called Berghmans point. In the case of UCST polymers, above the Berghmans point the phases separate into two liquid phases, below this point into a liquid polymer-poor phase and a vitrified polymer-rich phase. For LCST polymers the inverse behavior is observed.

== Thermodynamics ==
Polymers dissolve in a solvent when the Gibbs energy of the system decreases, i.e., the change of Gibbs energy (ΔG) is negative. From the known Legendre transformation of the Gibbs–Helmholtz equation it follows that ΔG is determined by the enthalpy of mixing (ΔH) and entropy of mixing (ΔS).

$\Delta G_{mix}=\Delta H_{mix}-T\cdot\Delta S_{mix}$

Without interactions between the compounds there would be no enthalpy of mixing and the entropy of mixing would be ideal. The ideal entropy of mixing of multiple pure compounds is always positive (the term -T∙ΔS is negative) and ΔG would be negative for all compositions, causing complete miscibility. Therefore, the fact that miscibility gaps are observed can only be explained by interaction. In the case of polymer solutions, polymer-polymer, solvent-solvent and polymer-solvent interactions have to be taken into account. A model for the phenomenological description of polymer phase diagrams was developed by Flory and Huggins (see Flory–Huggins solution theory). The resulting equation for the change of Gibbs energy consists of a term for the entropy of mixing for polymers and an interaction parameter that describes the sum of all interactions.

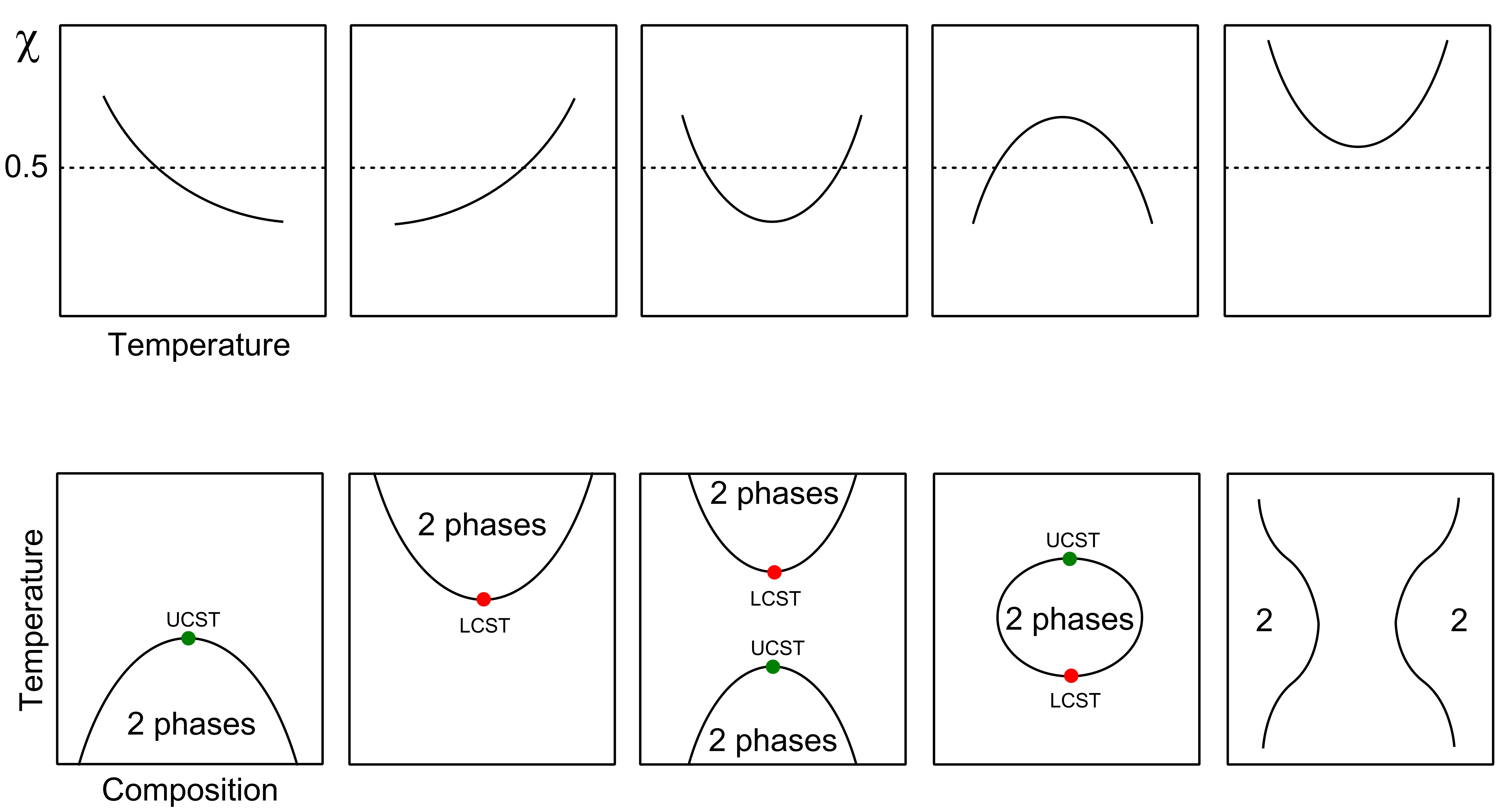
LCST or UCST behavior resulting from the temperature dependence of the interaction parameter

$\frac {\Delta G_{mix}} {RT}= \frac {\phi_1} m_1 ln\phi_1+ \frac {\phi_2} m_2 ln\phi_2+\chi \phi_1\phi_2$

where

- R = universal gas constant
- m = number of occupied lattice sites per molecule (for polymer solutions m_{1} is approximately equal to the degree of polymerization and m_{2}=1)
- φ = volume fraction of the polymer and the solvent, respectively
- χ = interaction parameter

A consequence of the Flory-Huggins theory is, for instance, that the UCST (if it exists) increases and shifts into the solvent-rich region when the molar mass of the polymer increases. Whether a polymer shows LCST and/or UCST behavior can be derived from the temperature-dependence of the interaction parameter (see figure). The interaction parameter not only comprises enthalpic contributions but also the non-ideal entropy of mixing, which again consists of many individual contributions (e.g., the strong hydrophobic effect in aqueous solutions). For these reasons, classical Flory-Huggins theory cannot provide much insight into the molecular origin of miscibility gaps.

== Applications ==
=== Bioseparation ===
Adhesion of cells on a surface coated with a thermoresponsive polymer. Displayed is a polymer with LCST

Thermoresponsive polymers can be functionalized with moieties that bind to specific biomolecules. The polymer-biomolecule conjugate can be precipitated from solution by a small change of temperature. Isolation may be achieved by filtration or centrifugation.

=== Thermoresponsive surfaces ===
==== Tissue engineering ====
For some polymers it was demonstrated that thermoresponsive behavior can be transferred to surfaces. The surface is either coated with a polymer film or the polymer chains are bound covalently to the surface. This provides a way to control the wetting properties of a surface by small temperature changes. The described behavior can be exploited in tissue engineering since the adhesion of cells is strongly dependent on the hydrophilicity/hydrophobicity. This way, it is possible to detach cells from a cell culture dish by only small changes in temperature, without the need to additionally use enzymes (see figure). Respective commercial products are already available.

==== Chromatography ====
Thermoresponsive polymers can be used as the stationary phase in liquid chromatography. Here, the polarity of the stationary phase can be varied by temperature changes, altering the power of separation without changing the column or solvent composition. Thermally related benefits of gas chromatography can now be applied to classes of compounds that are restricted to liquid chromatography due to their thermolability. In place of solvent gradient elution, thermoresponsive polymers allow the use of temperature gradients under purely aqueous isocratic conditions. The versatility of the system is controlled not only by changing temperature, but also by adding modifying moieties that allow for a choice of enhanced hydrophobic interaction, or by introducing the prospect of electrostatic interaction. These developments have already brought major improvements to the fields of hydrophobic interaction chromatography, size exclusion chromatography, ion exchange chromatography, and affinity chromatography separations, as well as pseudo-solid phase extractions ("pseudo" because of phase transitions).

=== Thermoresponsive gels ===
==== Covalently linked gels ====
Three-dimensional covalently linked polymer networks are insoluble in all solvents, they merely swell in good solvents. Thermoresponsive polymer gels show a discontinuous change of the degree of swelling with temperature. At the volume phase transition temperature (VPTT) the degree of swelling changes drastically. Researchers try to exploit this behavior for temperature-induced drug delivery. In the swollen state, previously incorporated drugs are released easily by diffusion. More sophisticated "catch and release" techniques have been elaborated in combination with lithography and molecular imprinting.

==== Physical gels ====
In physical gels unlike covalently linked gels the polymers chains are not covalently linked together. That means that the gel could re-dissolve in a good solvent under some conditions. Thermoresponsive physical gels, also sometimes called thermoresponsive injectable gels have been used in Tissue Engineering. This involves mixing at room temperature the thermoresponsive polymer in solution with the cells and then inject the solution to the body. Due to the temperature increase (to body temperature) the polymer creates a physical gel. Within this physical gel the cells are encapsulated. Tailoring the temperature that the polymer solution gels can be challenging because this depend by many factors like the polymer composition, architecture as well as the molar mass.

==== Thermoreversible materials ====
Some thermoreversible gels are used in biomedicine. For instance, hydrogels made of proteins are used as scaffolds in knee replacement. In baking, thermoreversible glazes such as pectin are prized for their ability to set and then reset after melting, and are used in nappage and other processes to ensure a smooth final surface for a presented dish. In manufacturing, thermoplastic elastomers can be set into a shape and then reset to their original shape through thermal reversibility, unlike one-way thermoset elastomers.

== Characterization of thermoresponsive polymer solutions ==
=== Cloud point ===
Experimentally, the phase separation can be followed by turbidimetry. There is no universal approach for determining the cloud point suitable for all systems. It is often defined as the temperature at the onset of cloudiness, the temperature at the inflection point of the transmittance curve, or the temperature at a defined transmittance (e.g., 50%). The cloud point can be affected by many structural parameters of the polymer like the hydrophobic content, architecture and even the molar mass.

=== Hysteresis ===
The cloud points upon cooling and heating of a thermoresponsive polymer solution do not coincide because the process of equilibration takes time. The temperature interval between the cloud points upon cooling and heating is called hysteresis. The cloud points are dependent on the cooling and heating rates, and hysteresis decreases with lower rates. There are indications that hysteresis is influenced by the temperature, viscosity, glass transition temperature and the ability to form additional intra- and inter-molecular hydrogen bonds in the phase separated state.

=== Other properties ===
Another important property for potential applications is the extent of phase separation, represented by the difference in polymer content in the two phases after phase separation. For most applications, phase separation in pure polymer and pure solvent would be desirable although it is practically impossible. The extent of phase separation in a given temperature interval depends on the particular polymer-solvent phase diagram.

Example: From the phase diagram of polystyrene (molar mass 43,600 g/mol) in the solvent cyclohexane it follows that at a total polymer concentration of 10%, cooling from 25 to 20 °C causes phase separation into a polymer-poor phase with 1% polymer and a polymer-rich phase with 30% polymer content.

Also desirable for many applications is a sharp phase transition, which is reflected by a sudden drop in transmittance. The sharpness of the phase transition is related to the extent of phase separation but additionally relies on whether all present polymer chains exhibit the same cloud point. This depends on the polymer endgroups, dispersity, or—in the case of copolymers—varying copolymer compositions. As a result of phase separation, thermoresponsive polymer systems can form well-defined self-assembled nanostructures with a number of different practical application such as in drug and gene delivery, tissue engineering, etc. In order to establish the required properties for applications, a rigorous characterization of the phase separation phenomenon can be carried out by different spectroscopic and calorimetric methods, including nuclear magnetic resonance (NMR), dynamic light scattering (DLS), small-angle X-ray scattering (SAXS), infrared spectroscopy (IR), Raman spectroscopy, and Differential scanning calorimetry (DSC).

== Examples of thermoresponsive polymers ==
=== Thermoresponsivity in organic solvents ===
Due to the low entropy of mixing, miscibility gaps are often observed for polymer solutions. Many polymers are known that show UCST or LCST behavior in organic solvents. Examples for organic polymer solutions with UCST are polystyrene in cyclohexane, polyethylene in diphenylether or polymethylmethacrylate in acetonitrile. An LCST is observed for, e.g., polypropylene in n-hexane, polystyrene in butylacetate or polymethylmethacrylate in 2-propanone.

=== Thermoresponsivity in water ===
Polymer solutions that show thermoresponsivity in water are especially important since water as a solvent is cheap, safe and biologically relevant. Current research efforts focus on water-based applications like drug delivery systems, tissue engineering, bioseparation (see the section Applications). Numerous polymers with LCST in water are known. The most studied polymer is poly(N-isopropylacrylamide). Further examples are poly[2-(dimethylamino)ethyl methacrylate] (pDMAEMA) hydroxypropylcellulose, poly(vinylcaprolactam), poly-2-isopropyl-2-oxazoline and polyvinyl methyl ether.

Some industrially relevant polymers show LCST as well as UCST behavior whereas the UCST is found outside the 0-to-100 °C region and can only be observed under extreme experimental conditions. Examples are polyethylene oxide, polyvinylmethylether and polyhydroxyethylmethacrylate. There are also polymers that exhibit UCST behavior between 0 and 100 °C. However, there are large differences concerning the ionic strength at which UCST behavior is detected. Some zwitterionic polymers show UCST behavior in pure water and also in salt-containing water or even at higher salt concentration. By contrast, polyacrylic acid displays UCST behavior solely at high ionic strength. Examples for polymer that show UCST behavior in pure water as well as under physiological conditions are poly(N-acryloylglycinamide), ureido-functionalized polymers, copolymers from N-vinylimidazole and 1-vinyl-2-(hydroxylmethyl)imidazole or copolymers from acrylamide and acrylonitrile. Polymers for which UCST relies on non-ionic interactions are very sensitive to ionic contamination. Small amounts of ionic groups may suppress phase separation in pure water.

The UCST is dependent on the molecular mass of the polymer. For the LCST this is not necessarily the case, as shown for poly(N-isopropylacrylamide).

=== Schizophrenic behavior of UCST-LCST diblock copolymers ===
A more complex scenario can be found in the case of diblock copolymers that feature two orthogonally thermo-responsive blocks, i.e., an UCST and an LCST-type block. By applying a temperature stimulus, the individual polymer blocks show different phase transitions, e.g. by increasing the temperature, the UCST-type block features an insoluble-soluble transition, while the LCST-type block undergoes a soluble-insoluble transition. The order of the individual phase transitions depends on the relative positions of the UCST and LCST. Thus, upon temperature change the roles of the soluble and insoluble polymer blocks are reversed and this structural inversion is typically called 'schizophrenic' in the literature. Besides the fundamental interest in the mechanism of this behavior, such block copolymers have been proposed for application in smart emulsification, drug delivery, and rheology control. Schizophrenic diblock copolymer have also been applied as thin films for potential use as sensors, smart coatings or nanoswitches, and soft robotics.
