= Frigorific mixture =

Independent equilibrium temperature

A frigorific mixture is a mixture of two or more phases in a chemical system that, so long as none of the phases are completely consumed during equilibration, reaches an equilibrium temperature that is independent of the starting temperature of the phases before they were mixed, and independent of the proportions in which they were mixed.

== Ice ==
Liquid water and ice, for example, form a frigorific mixture at 0 °C (32 °F). Prior to 1954, this property was used to define the zero point of the Celsius scale. (Note: Between 1954 and 2019, a definition setting 0.01 °C to the triple point of water with well-defined isotope ratios was instead used.)

A mixture of ammonium chloride, water, and ice form a frigorific mixture at about −15.5 °C (4 °F), (Note: The eutectic temperature of ammonium chloride and water is listed as −15.9 °C (3.38 °F) and as −15.4 °C (4.28 °F) in (respectively): Peppin, S. S.; Huppert, H. E.; Worster, M. G. (2008). "Steady-state solidification of aqueous ammonium chloride" (PDF). J. Fluid Mech. 159. Cambridge University Press: 472 (table 1). Bibcode:2008JFM...599..465P. doi:10.1017/S0022112008000219. S2CID 30271164. Archived (PDF) from the original on 2010-01-19.; Barman, N.; Nayak, A. K.; Chattopadhyay, H. (2021). "Solidification of a Binary Solution (NH_{4}Cl + H_{2}O) on an Inclined Cooling Plate: A Parametric Study" (PDF). Procedia Materials Science. 7: 456 (table 1). doi:10.1016/j.mspro.2014.07.288. Archived (PDF) from the original on 2019-01-15.) and a mixture of sodium chloride, water, and ice form a frigorific mixture at −22 °C (−8 °F). These mixtures were originally used to define the zero point of the Fahrenheit scale; John Albert Newton Friend suggests Fahrenheit was unaware they yielded different temperatures.

== Explanation ==
The existence of frigorific mixtures can be viewed as a consequence of the Gibbs phase rule, which describes the relationship at equilibrium between the number of components, the number of coexisting phases, and the number of degrees of freedom permitted by the conditions of heterogeneous equilibrium. Specifically, at constant atmospheric pressure, in a system containing C linearly independent chemical components, if C+1 phases are specified to be present in equilibrium, then the system is fully determined (there are no degrees of freedom). That is, the temperature and the compositions of all phases are determined. Thus, in for example the chemical system H_{2}O-NaCl, which has two components, the simultaneous presence of the three phases liquid, ice, and hydrohalite, at atmospheric pressure, can exist only at the unique temperature of –21.2 °C. The approach to equilibrium of a frigorific mixture involves spontaneous temperature change driven by the conversion of latent heat into sensible heat as the phase proportions adjust to accommodate the decrease in thermodynamic potential associated with the approach to equilibrium.

== Other examples ==
Other examples of frigorific mixtures include:

Materials	Parts (w/w)	Equilibrium temperature
Ammonium chloride (NH_{4}Cl)	5	−12 °C / 10 °F / 261 K
Potassium nitrate (KNO_{3})	5	−12 °C / 10 °F / 261 K
Water	16	−12 °C / 10 °F / 261 K
Ammonium chloride (NH_{4}Cl)	5	−15.5 °C / 4 °F / 257.5 K
Water	16	−15.5 °C / 4 °F / 257.5 K
Ammonium nitrate (NH_{4}NO_{3})	1	−15.5 °C / 4 °F / 257.5 K
Water	1	−15.5 °C / 4 °F / 257.5 K
Sodium sulfate (Na_{2}SO_{4})	3	−16 °C / 3 °F / 257 K
Dilute nitric acid (HNO_{3})	2	−16 °C / 3 °F / 257 K
Sodium sulfate (Na_{2}SO_{4})	8	−18 °C / 0 °F / 255 K
Hydrochloric acid (HCl)	5	−18 °C / 0 °F / 255 K
Snow/ice	1	−18 °C / 0 °F / 255 K
Sodium chloride (NaCl)	1	−18 °C / 0 °F / 255 K
Snow/ice	1	−26 °C / −15 °F / 247 K
Potassium hydroxide (KOH)	1	−26 °C / −15 °F / 247 K
Snow/ice	1	−51 °C / −60 °F / 222 K
Sulfuric acid, dilute (H_{2}SO_{4})	1	−51 °C / −60 °F / 222 K
Snow/ice	2	−55 °C / −67 °F / 218 K
Calcium chloride (CaCl_{2})	3	−55 °C / −67 °F / 218 K
Sulfuric acid, dilute (H_{2}SO_{4})	10	−68 °C / −90 °F / 205 K
Snow/ice	8	−68 °C / −90 °F / 205 K

== Uses ==
A frigorific mixture may be used to obtain a liquid medium that has a reproducible temperature below ambient temperature. Such mixtures were used to calibrate thermometers. In chemistry a cooling bath may be used to control the temperature of a strongly exothermic reaction.

A frigorific mixture may be used as an alternative to mechanical refrigeration. For example to fit two machined metal parts together, one part is placed in a frigorific mixture, causing it to contract so that may be easily inserted into the uncooled second part; on warming the two parts are held together tightly. Another example is the Piper process, used in the second half of the 19th century for freezing and cold storage of fish.

== Limitations of acid base slushes ==
Mixtures relying on the use of acid base slushes are of limited practical value beyond producing melting point references as the enthalpy of dissolution for the melting point depressant is often significantly greater (e.g. ΔH -57.61 kJ/mol for KOH) than the enthalpy of fusion for water itself (ΔH 6.02 kJ/mol); for reference, ΔH for the dissolution of NaCl is 3.88 kJ/mol. This results in little to no net cooling capacity at the desired temperatures and an end mixture temperature that is higher than it was to begin with. The values claimed in the table are produced by first precooling and then combining each subsequent mixture with it surrounded by a mixture of the previous temperature increment; the mixtures must be 'stacked' within one another.

Such acid base slushes are corrosive and therefore present handling problems. Additionally, they can not be replenished easily, as the volume of the mixture increases with each addition of refrigerant; the container (be it a bath or cold finger) will eventually need emptying and refilling to prevent it from overflowing. This makes these mixtures largely unsuitable for use in synthetic applications, as there will be no cooling surface present during the emptying of the container.

== See also ==
- Cooling bath
