= Polymer solution =

Homogeneous mixture containing dissolved polymers

Polymer solutions are solutions containing dissolved polymers. These may exist as liquid solutions (e.g. in aqueous solution), or as solid solutions (e.g. a plasticized substance). Unlike simple solutions of small molecules, polymer solutions exhibit unique physical and chemical behaviors, due to the size, flexibility, and entanglement of the polymer chains. The study of these systems is important both in fundamental science and in practical applications, as many everyday materials are made from polymers dissolved in liquids.

Dissolving a polymer in a solvent (plasticizer) is not as straightforward as dissolving small molecules such as salts or sugars. Polymers are too large to diffuse rapidly and uniformly throughout a liquid, and their solubility depends strongly on interactions between the polymer segments and the solvent molecules. A solvent that interacts favorably with the polymer will swell and separate the polymer chains, producing a stable solution. In contrast, weak interactions may cause the polymer to collapse on itself or precipitate out of the solution.

A defining feature of polymer solutions is their concentration-dependent behavior. At very low concentrations, each polymer molecule behaves independently, floating freely in the solvent. This is known as the dilute regime. As concentration increases, the polymer coils begin to overlap, producing the semidilute regime, where entanglement and crowding affect solution properties. At even higher concentrations, the solution takes on characteristics of a melt, with strong chain-chain interactions dominating its behavior.

The viscosity of polymer solutions highlights their differences from simple molecular mixtures. Even small amounts of polymer can significantly increase viscosity because the long chains resist flow as they entangle and stretch in the liquid. This effect is exploited in many industries, where polymers are used to thicken liquids, stabilize dispersions, or control flow properties. For example, polymer additives in foods improve texture, while those in paints help control drip and spreading.

Thermodynamics plays a central role in understanding polymer solutions. The Flory-Huggins theory describes how the balance between enthalpic and entropic contributions determines whether a polymer will dissolve in a given solvent. Temperature also influences solubility, as some polymer solutions undergo phase separation upon heating or cooling, due to molecular interactions. These temperature-dependent transitions are widely studied for applications in smart materials and drug delivery systems.

Introducing small amounts of solvent into a polymer reduces the glass transition temperature, yield temperature, and melt viscosity. Understanding the thermodynamics of a polymer solution is critical in manufacturing processes. For example, its shrinkage or expansion in injection molding processes, or whether pigments and solvents will mix evenly with a polymer in the manufacture of paints and coatings. A recent theory on the viscosity of polymer solutions gives a physical explanation for various well-known empirical relations and numerical values including the Huggins constant, but reveals also novel simple concentration and molar mass dependence.

== Thermodynamics ==
=== Free Energy ===
==== Monomer Mixing ====
For a binary mixture of two monomers, $A$ and $B$, The total number of particles is:

$M = N_A + N_B$

with volume fractions:

$\phi_A = \frac{N_A}{M} \quad ; \quad \phi_B = \frac{N_B}{M}$

so that:

$\phi_A + \phi_B =1$

Defining $\phi\equiv \phi_A$, the normalized free energy of mixing is: $f_{mix} = \frac{\Delta F_{mix}}{M}$ will provide:

$f_{\mathrm{mix}} = \frac{\Delta F_{\mathrm{mix}}}{M} = k_B T \left[ \chi \phi (1-\phi) + \phi \ln \phi + (1-\phi)\ln (1-\phi) \right]$

where

$\chi = \chi_{AB} - \frac{\chi_{AA}+\chi_{BB}}{2}$

is the Flory-Huggins interaction parameter, describing relative interactions between $A$ and $B$. If the interactions are attractive $(\chi<0)$, mixing is favored; if repulsive $(\chi>0)$, phase separation may occur. The entropic term arises from the partition function of indistinguishable particles in the thermodynamic limit.

==== Polymer Mixing ====
Extending to polymer solutions, each chain occupies many lattice sites. Introducing the relative chain fraction $\phi_p = \frac{\phi}{N}$. There are three types of interaction in the lattice (solvent-solvent, monomer-monomer, and solvent-monomer). Denoting the interaction between any two particles $u_{\alpha\beta}$ gives:

$mm: z\phi^2u_{mm} \quad ; \quad ss: z(1-\phi)^2u_{ss} \quad ; \quad sm: 2z\phi(1-\phi)u_{sm}$

where $z$ is the coordination number of the lattice and the two factor in the $sm$ expression comes from the $sm-ms$ symmetry. Overall, the per-particle internal energy is:

$\Delta u_{mix} = \frac{1}{2} z u_{ss}(1-\phi)^2 + \frac{1}{2} z u_{m}\phi^2 +zu_{sm} \phi(1-\phi) - \left( \frac{1}{2} z u_{ss}(1-\phi) + \frac{1}{2} z u_{mm}\phi \right)$

The right term is the segregated per-particle internal energy, whereas the left terms are the mixed values, seen above. This simplifies to:

$\Delta u_{mix} = z\left(u_{sm} - \frac{u_{ss} + u_{mm}}{2} \right) \phi(1-\phi) \equiv k_BT\chi\phi(1-\phi)$

The entropy term changes are a little more distinct. Since the monomers in each polymer are connected, the total number of configurations can be approximated to leading order:

$\Omega_{AB} = \frac{(N_A + N_B)!}{\left(\frac{N_A}{N}\right)!N_B!}$

Evaluating the entropy:

$\Delta s_{mix} = -k_B \left( \phi_p \ln \phi +(1-\phi)\ln(1-\phi) + \alpha \phi + \mathcal{O}\left(\frac{1}{N^2}\right) \right)$

The last two terms are constant and negligible and do not affect the system.

Rewriting the dimensionless free energy of the mixture:

$\hat{f} = \frac{f}{k_BT} = \chi\phi(1-\phi) + \phi_p \ln \phi + (1-\phi) \ln (1-\phi)$

While the monomer solution is symmetric to the exchange $\phi \rightarrow 1-\phi$, the polymer solution is not. This is due to the fact that the entropy in polymer solutions is lower than in monomer solutions, since the monomers in each polymer must be connected to one another. Thus, a change in the concentration, even if symmetric, will change the entropy.

In the case $N=1$, $\phi_p = \phi_A$, which is the lattice gas (monomer solution) free energy.

In the general case of a mixture of $n$ components, each fractional concentration is denoted as:

$\phi_i = \frac{N_i}{\sum_{j=1}^n N_j} \quad ; \quad \Sigma_i\phi_i = 1$

and the total mixing entropy is:

$\Delta s_{mix} = -k_B \sum_{i=1}^n \frac{\phi_i}{N_i}\ln \phi_i$,

and the total dimensionless free energy is:

$\hat f = \sum_{i<j}\chi_{ij}\phi_i \phi_j + \sum_i \frac{\phi_i}{N_i}\ln \phi_i$

=== Polymer-Solvent Phases ===
The solution's free energy is used to examine how well two (or more) chains are soluble. As long as $\hat{f}$ is convex $\left(\frac{\partial^2\hat{f}}{\partial \phi^2} \geq 0\right)$, the system has a single phase, meaning, the solvent and polymer are mixed. On the other hand, if the free energy is concave $\left(\frac{\partial^2\hat{f}}{\partial \phi^2} \leq 0\right)$, multiple phases can appear, and the solution won't mix. When $\chi<0$, both the energetic and entropic components are convex, meaning that the solution will default to mixing. In cases where $\chi>0$, phase separation is possible, depending on the convexity of the free energy.

==== Common Tangent Phase Separation ====
In order to find where the separation of phases occurs, $\hat{f}$ can be minimized when the order parameter $\phi$ is constrained. After defining a Lagrange multiplier $\mu$ and the unconstrained function $\hat g = \hat f - \mu\phi$, minimizing $g$, yields the equation:

$\frac{\partial \hat g}{\partial \phi} =\frac{\partial \hat f}{\partial \phi} - \mu \ \stackrel{!}{=} \ 0$

meaning, $\mu$ is tangent to the free energy. Whenever $g$ has two solutions, a phase separation occurs. Therefore:

$\hat g(\phi_1) = \hat g(\phi_2)$

implies:

$\frac{\hat f(\phi_1) - \hat f(\phi_2)}{\phi_1 - \phi_2} = \mu = \frac{\partial \hat f}{\partial \phi} \bigg|_{\phi_1} = \frac{\partial \hat f}{\partial \phi} \bigg|_{\phi_2}$

Therefore, minimizing $\hat g$ is equivalent to finding the common tangent.

==== Coexistence and Spinodal Curves ====
Solving the above equation for the interaction parameter $\chi$ corresponds to the phase boundary. In the symmetric case of a solution of two monomers ($\mu = 0$):

$\chi_b = \frac{\ln \left( \phi / (1-\phi) \right)}{N(2\phi-1)}$

Since, phenomenologically, $\chi \cong A + \frac{B}{T}$, the temperature dependence of the phase separation, or the coexistence curve is:

$T_b = \frac{B}{\ln [\phi / (1-\phi)] / [(2\phi-1)N] - A}$

The spinodal curve satisfies $\frac{\partial ^2 f}{\partial \phi^2} = 0$, In the case of a solution of two polymers, this equates to:

$\chi_s(\phi) = \frac{1}{2} \left[ \frac{1}{N_A \phi} + \frac{1}{N_B (1-\phi)} \right]$

Extremizing the curve provides the critical composition $\phi_c$, at which the system changes from being a two-phase system to a one-phase system:

$\phi_c=\frac{1}{1+\sqrt{N_A/N_B}} \quad ; \quad \chi_c = \frac{1}{2} \left[ \frac{1}{\sqrt{N_A}} + \frac{1}{\sqrt{N_B}} \right]$

At the monomer solution limit, the critical composition is $\frac{1}{2}$. For highly asymmetric chains ($N_A \gg N_B$), $\phi_c \rightarrow 0$, meaning miscibility only at very low concentrations.

==== Phase Transitions in Many-Particle Solutions ====
For mixtures with more than two components, phase transitions are determined by analyzing the Hessian matrix of second derivatives of the free energy. Its eigenvalues indicate whether the system is stable or unstable.

== Applications ==
Polymer solutions are used in producing fibers, films, glues, lacquers, paints, and a wide range of polymer-based materials. Thin layers of polymer solution can also be deposited to produce light-emitting devices. Guar-based polymer gels are employed in hydraulic fracturing ("fracking").

=== Coatings and Adhesives ===
Polymer solutions are commonly used in paints, varnishes, and industrial coatings.Dissolving polymers in solvents produces a fluid mixture that can be applied to surfaces; upon drying or curing, the polymer forms a protective layer with properties such as durability, water resistance, and flexibility. Acrylic and polyurethane solutions are widely used in automotive and architectural coatings, due to their capacity to withstand harsh environments and UV exposure, while specialized formulations provide anticorrosive or flame-retardant finishes.

Adhesives also rely on polymer solutions. Pressure-sensitive adhesives (such as those in tapes and labels) exploit the viscoelastic behavior of polymers to create reversible bonds. Structural adhesives, used in construction, automotive, and aerospace applications, incorporate polymer solutions of epoxy, cyanoacrylate, or polyurethane to achieve strong, permanent joints resistant to temperature extremes and chemicals.

=== Biomedical Devices ===
Polymer solutions are also indispensable in medical device manufacturing, where biocompatibility and precise microstructure are essential. Hydrogels are widely produced from polymer solutions and used for contact lenses, wound dressings, and drug delivery systems. Their ability to mimic natural tissue environments supports cell adhesion and tissue growth, which is crucial for implantable devices and regenerative medicine scaffolds. For instance, polyvinyl alcohol and polyethylene glycol solutions enable the creation of soft, transparent lenses or hydrophilic bandages that promote healing and patient comfort.

In tissue engineering, polymer solutions are also used to fabricate porous scaffolds that act as templates for reconstructing damaged organs or tissues. By adjusting solution concentration, molecular weight, and processing techniques (such as electrospinning or freeze-drying), engineers can control pore size, mechanical properties, and degradation rates. These capabilities provide significant advantages over traditional materials, as biomedical polymers can be tailored to dissolve harmlessly within the body or offer sustained drug release, thereby reducing complications and improving patient outcomes.

=== Textiles ===
The textile industry employs polymer solutions in both fiber production and surface finishing. Synthetic fibers such as nylon, acrylic, and polyester are formed by spinning polymer solutions into filaments, enabling control of tensile strength, elasticity, and moisture absorption, contributing to more comfortable, durable, and functional clothing. Finishes derived from polymer solutions provide fabrics with water repellency, stain resistance, or antimicrobial properties.

Polymer solutions are also used in dyeing processes to achieve uniform color penetration. Conductive polymer solutions can be printed onto fabrics to create flexible circuits, enabling the development of smart textiles.

=== Electronics ===
Polymer solutions are central to modern electronic devices. Thin insulating layers in capacitors, transistors, and integrated circuits are often deposited from solution and cured into dielectric films. Flexible displays and touchscreens use conducting polymer solutions, such as PEDOT:PSS, which are amenable to printing techniques and can be deposited on plastic, glass, and other surfaces.

The production of organic light-emitting diodes (OLEDS), organic photovoltaics (solar cells), and bioelectronics leverages the solubility and processability of polymers to build lightweight, bendable components. As miniaturization and flexibility become ever more critical in modern electronics, the importance of polymer solutions continues to grow. Their low cost, ease of processing, and ability to impart tailored electrical properties support the next wave of consumer devices and smart wearables.

=== Membrane Technology ===
Polymer solutions are widely used to produce membranes for filtration and purification applications. Casting solutions of polysulfone or cellulose acetate yields membranes with controlled pore sizes and chemical selectivity, useful in water treatment and desalination.

Other applications include gas separation, pharmaceutical purification, and recovery of industrial byproducts. The ability to design membranes with selective permeability and stability under demanding conditions makes polymer solution-derived membranes important in environmental management and resource recovery.

== See also ==
- Flory–Huggins solution theory
- Colloid systems
- Gel
- Solution polymerization
