= Elastin-like polypeptides =

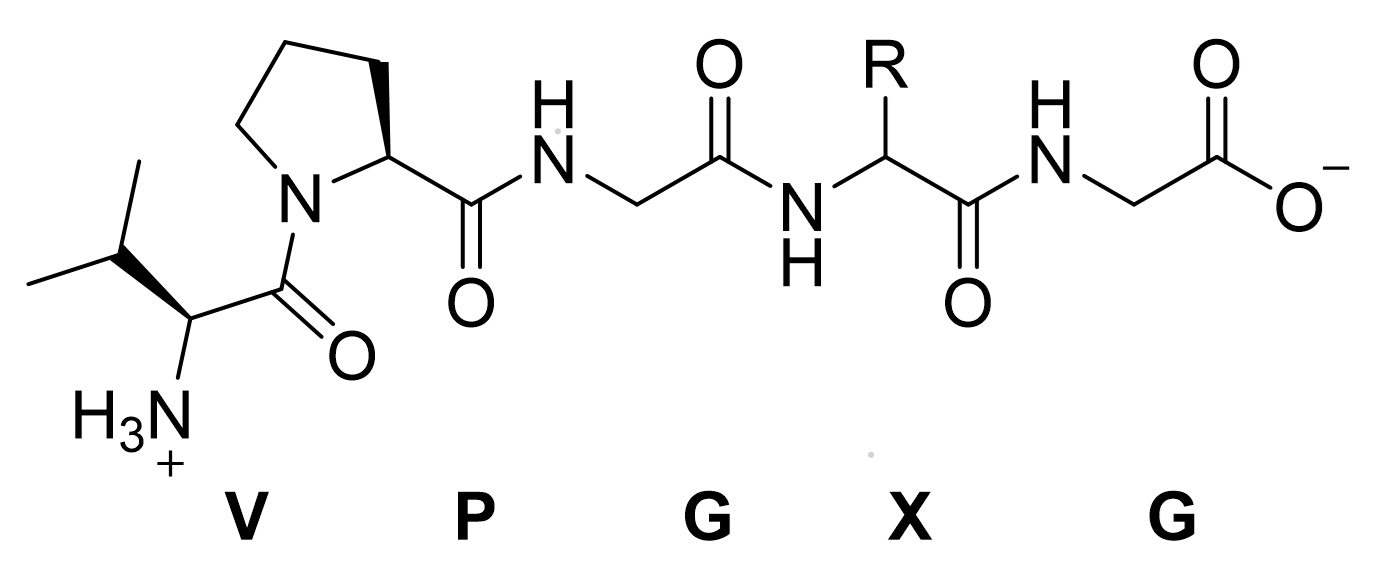
Depicted above is the monomeric ELP unit. X represents an arbitrary amino acid. Polymers are formed from this pentapeptide monomeric unite.

Elastin-like polypeptides (ELPs) are synthetic biopolymers with potential applications in the fields of cancer therapy, tissue scaffolding, metal recovery, and protein purification. For cancer therapy, the addition of functional groups to ELPs can enable them to conjugate with cytotoxic drugs. Also, ELPs may be able to function as polymeric scaffolds, which promote tissue regeneration. This capacity of ELPs has been studied particularly in the context of bone growth. ELPs can also be engineered to recognize specific proteins in solution. The ability of ELPs to undergo morphological changes at certain temperatures enables specific proteins that are bound to the ELPs to be separated out from the rest of the solution via experimental techniques such as centrifugation.

The general structure of polymeric ELPs is (VPGXG)_{n}, where the monomeric unit is Val-Pro-Gly-X-Gly, and the "X" denotes a variable amino acid that can have consequences on the general properties of the ELP, such as the transition temperature (T_{t}). Specifically, the hydrophilicity or hydrophobicity and the presence or absence of a charge on the guest residue play a great role in determining the T_{t.} Also, the solubilization of the guest residue can effect the T_{t.} The "n" denotes the number of monomeric units that comprise the polymer. In general, these polymers are linear below the T_{t}, but aggregate into spherical clumps above the T_{t.}.

== Structure ==
Although engineered and modified in a laboratory setting, ELPs share structural characteristics with intrinsically disordered proteins (IDPs) naturally found in the body, such as tropoelastin, from which ELPs were given their name. The repeat sequences found in the biopolymer give each ELP a distinct structure, as well as influence the lower critical solution temperature (LCST), also referred to commonly as the T_{t}. It is at this temperature that the ELPs move from a linear, relatively disordered state to a more densely aggregated, partially ordered state Although given as a single temperature, T_{t,} the ELP phase change process generally begins and ends within a temperature range of approximately 2 °C. Also, T_{t} is altered by the addition of unique proteins to the free ELPs.

=== Tropoelastin ===
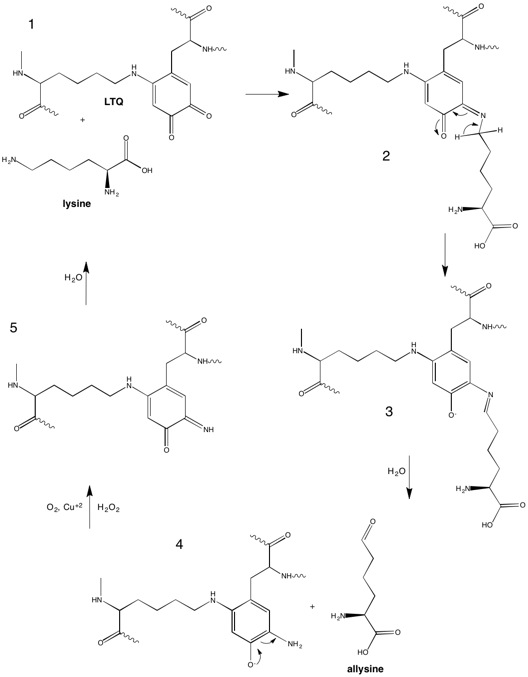
This image displays the mechanism by which lysine residues on tropoelastin are cross-linked together. Conversion of some lysine residues to allysine occurs first, followed by bonding between lysine and allysine. This enables the elastin to form in the extracellular matrix.

Tropoelastin is a protein, of size 72kDa, that comes together via cross-links to form elastin in the extracellular matrix of the cell. The cross-link formation process is mediated by lysyl oxidase. One of the major reasons that elastin can withstand high levels of stress in the body without experiencing any physical deformation is that the underlying tropoelastin contains domains that are highly hydrophobic. These hydrophobic domains, consisting overwhelmingly of alanine, proline, glycine, and valine, tend towards instability and disorderliness, ensuring that the elastin does not lock into any specific confirmation. Thus, ELPs consisting of the Val-Pro-Gly-X-Gly monomeric units, which bear resemblance to the repetitive tropoelastin hydrophobic domains, are highly disordered below their T_{t.} Even above their T_{t} in their aggregated state, ELPs are only partially ordered. This is due to the fact that the proline and glycine amino acids are present in high amounts in the ELP. Glycine, due to the lack of a bulky side chain, enables the biopolymer to be flexible and proline prevents the formation of stable hydrogen bonds in the ELP backbone. Certain segments of the ELP may be able to form instantaneous type II β turns, but these turns are not long-lasting and do not resemble true β sheets, when the NMR chemical shifts are compared.

This video depicts the assembly of tropoelastin units to form elastin.

=== Amyloid formation ===
Although ELPs generally form reversible spherical aggregates due to their proline and glycine content, there is a possibility that, under certain conditions such as exceedingly high temperatures, ELPs will form amyloids, or irreversible aggregates of insoluble protein. It is also believed that changes in the ELP backbone leading to a reduction in the proline and glycine content may lead to ELPs with a greater propensity for the amyloid state. As amyloids are implicated in the progression of Alzheimer's disease as well as in prion-based diseases, such as Creutzfeldt-Jakob disease (CJD), modeling of ELP amyloid formation may be useful from a biomedical standpoint.

=== T_{t} dependence on ELP structure ===
The transition temperature of an ELP depends to a certain extent on the identity of the "X" residue found at the fourth position of the pentapeptide monomeric unit. Residues that are highly hydrophobic, such as leucine and phenylalanine, tend to decrease the transition temperature. On the other hand, residues that are highly hydrophilic, such as serine and glutamine, tend to increase the transition temperature. The presence of a potentially charged residue at the "X" position will determine how the ELP responds to varying pHs, with glutamic acid and aspartic acid raising the T_{t} at pH values in which the residues are deprotonated and lysine and arginine raising the T_{t} at pH values in which the residues are protonated. The pH needs to be compatible with the charged states of these amino acids in order to raise the T_{t}. Also higher molecular mass ELPs and higher concentrations of ELPs in solution make it much easier for the polymer to form aggregates, in effect lowering the experimental T_{t.}

=== T_{t} theoretical model ===
Oftentimes, ELPs are not used in isolation, but are rather fused with other proteins to become functionally active. The structure of these other proteins will have a certain effect on transition temperature. It is important to be able to predict the transition temperature that these fusion proteins will have relative to the free ELPs, as this temperature will determine the fused protein's applicability and phase transition. A theoretical model is available that relates the change in T_{t} of the fused protein to the varying ratios of each individual amino acid found in the fused protein. The model involves calculating a surface index (SI) associated with each amino acid and then extrapolating, based on the ratio of each amino acid present in the fused protein, the total change in the T_{t} associated with the fusion protein, ΔT_{t,fusion}:

SI=$\sum_{XAA}^{}$(ASA_{XAA}/ ASA_{p})(T_{tc})

where ASA_{p} refers to the area of the entire fused protein that is available to the solvent that is being used, ASA_{XAA} refers to the area of the guest residue on the ELP that is available to the solvent, and T_{tc} is the transition temperature that is unique to the amino acid. Summing up the contribution of each potential guest residue (XAA) will yield an SI index that is directly proportional to ΔT_{t,fusion.} It was found that the amino acids that are charged under a physiological pH of 7.4 have the greatest impact on the overall SI of a fused protein. This is due to the fact that they are more accessible to water-containing solvents, thereby increasing the ASA_{XAA} and also have high T_{tc} values. Hence, knowledge of the transition temperature of a fused protein is highly dependent on the presence of these charged residues.

== Synthesis ==
Because ELPs are protein-based biopolymers, synthesis involves manipulation of genes to continually express the monomeric repeat unit. Various techniques have been employed in the production of ELPs of various sizes, including unidirectional ligation or concatemerization, overlap extension polymerase chain reaction (OEPCR), and recursive directional ligation (RDL). Also, ELPs can be experimentally modified through conjugation with other polymers or through SpyTag/SpyCatcher reaction, allowing for the synthesis of copolymers with unique morphology.

=== Concatemerization ===
The concatemerization process generates libraries of concatamers for the ELPs. Concatamers are oligomeric products of ligating a single gene with itself. This will result in repeat segments of a gene, all of which can be transcribed and translated immediately to produce the ELP of interest. A major problem with this synthetic route is that the number of gene repeat segments ligated together to form the concatamer cannot be controlled, leading to ELPs of different sizes, from which the ELP of a desired size must be isolated.

=== Overlap extension polymerase chain reaction (OEPCR) ===
The OEPCR method uses a small amount of the gene encoding the monomeric ELP unit and leads to the amplification of this segment to a great extent. This amplification is due to the fact that the initial segment added to the reaction functions as a template, from which identical gene segments can be synthesized. The process will result in the production of double-stranded DNA encoding the ELP of interest. One major bottleneck associated with this method is the potentially low fidelity associated with the Taq polymerase used. This might lead to replication from the template in which the wrong nucleotides are incorporated into the growing DNA strand.

=== Recursive directional ligation (RDL) ===
In recursive directional ligation, the gene encoding the monomer is inserted into a plasmid with restriction sites that are recognized by at least two endonucleases. The endonucleases will cut the plasmid, releasing the gene of interest. Then, this single gene is inserted into a recipient plasmid vector already containing one copy of the ELP monomer gene via digestion of the recipient plasmid with the same restriction endonucleases used on the donor plasmid and a subsequent ligation step. From this process, a sequence of two ELP monomer genes is retrieved. RDL allows for the controlled synthesis of ELP gene oligomers, in which single gene segments are sequentially added. However, the restriction endonucleases used are limited to those that do not cut within the ELP monomer gene itself, as this would lead to loss of crucial nucleotides and a potential frameshift mutation in the protein.

=== Synthetic conjugation ===
ELPs can be synthetically conjugated to poly (ethylene glycol) by adding a cyclooctyne functional motif to the poly (ethylene glycol) and an azide group to the ELP. Through a cycloaddition reaction involving both of the functional groups and manipulation of the solvent pH, diblock and star polymers can be formed. Rather than forming the canonical spherical clumps above the transition temperature, this specific conjugated ELP forms a micelle with amphiphilic properties, in which the polar head groups face outward and the hydrophobic domains face inward. Such micelles may be helpful in delivering nonpolar drugs to the body.

== Applications ==
Due to the unique temperature-dependent phase transition experienced by ELPs, in which they move from a linear state to a spherical aggregate state above their T_{t}, as well as the ability of ELPs to be easily conjugated with other compounds, these biopolymers hold numerous applications. Some of these applications involve ELP use in protein purification, cancer therapy, and tissue scaffolding.

=== Protein purification ===
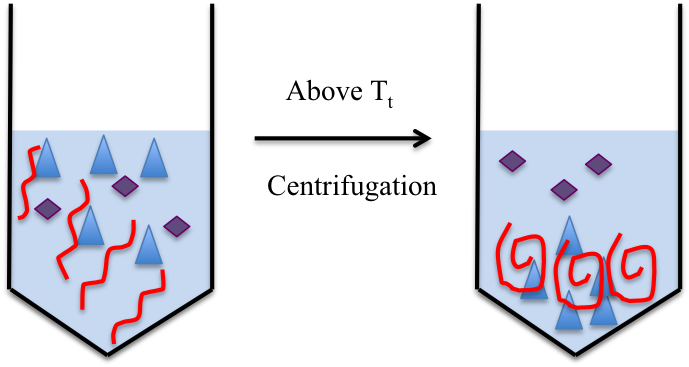
This diagram shows how proteins can isolated using ELP technology. At temperatures below the transition temperature, the ELP remains in its linear state but binds to the protein of interest via a functional group. As the solution is heated above the transition temperature, the ELP will start to form spherical clumps that will aggregate at the bottom of the tube following centrifugation. The ELP will contain the protein of interest (blue) and separate it from extraneous proteins (purple).

The ELP can be conjugated to a functional group that can bind to a protein of interest. At temperatures below the T_{t,} the ELP will bind to the ligand in its linear form. In this linear state, the ELP-protein complex cannot easily be distinguished from the extraneous proteins in the solution. However, once the solution is heated to a temperature exceeding the T_{t,} the ELP will form spherical clumps. These clumps will then settle to the bottom of the solution tube following centrifugation, carrying the protein of interest. The proteins that are not needed will be found in the supernatant, which can be physically separated from the spherical aggregates. To ensure that there are few impurities in the ELP-protein complex isolated, the solution can be cooled below the T_{t,} enabling the ELPs to once again assume their linear structure. From this point, hot and cold centrifugation cycles can be repeated, and then the protein of interest can be eluted from the ELPs via the addition of a salt.

=== Tissue scaffolding ===
The temperature-based phase behavior of ELPs can be utilized to produce stiff networks that may be compatible with cellular regeneration applications. At high concentrations (weight percent exceeding 15%), the ELP transition from a linear state to a spherical aggregate state above the transition temperature is arrested, leading to the formation of brittle gels. These otherwise brittle networks can then be modified chemically, via oxidative coupling, to yield hydrogels which can sustain high levels of mechanical stress and strain. Also, the modified gel networks contain pores, through which important cell-sustaining compounds can easily be delivered. Such strong hydrogels, when bathed in minimal cell media, have been found to promote the growth of human mesencyhmal stem cell populations. The ability of these arrested ELP networks to promote cell growth may prove indispensable in the production of tissue scaffolds that promote cartilage production, for example. Such an intervention may prove useful in the treatment of bone disease and rheumatoid arthritis.

=== Drug delivery ===
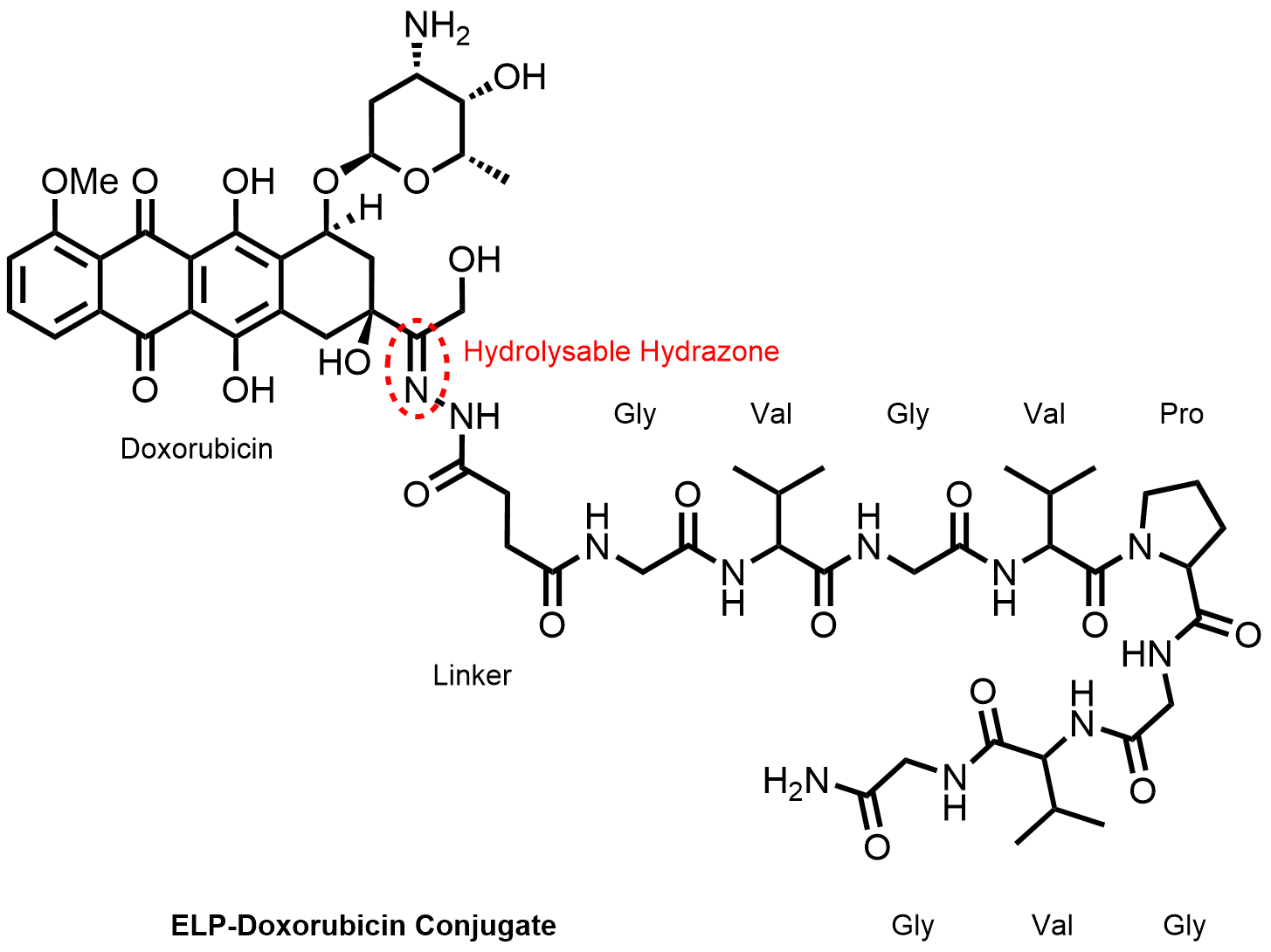
Depicted above is the structure of an ELP-Doxorubicin conjugate. The ELP is coupled to Doxorubicin with a hydrolysable hydrazone linker.

ELPs modified with certain functional groups have the capacity to be conjugated with drugs, including chemotherapeutic agents. Together, the ELP-drug complex can be taken up by tumor cells to a greater extent, promoting the cytotoxic activity of the drug. The reason that the complexes preferentially target the tumor cells is that these cells tend to be associated with more permeable blood vessels and also possess a weaker lymphatic presence. This essentially means that the drugs can cross over from the vessels to the tumor cells more frequently and can remain in the vessels for a longer period of time, without being filtered out. The phase transition associated with ELPs can also be used to promote tumor cell uptake of the drug. By locally heating tumor cell regions, the ELP-drug complex will aggregate into spherical clumps. If this ELP-drug complex is engineered to expose functional domains in the spherical clump shape that are recognized by tumor cell surfaces, then this cell surface interaction would promote uptake of the drug as the tumor cell would mistake the ELP-drug complex as being a harmless substance.

=== Metal recovery ===
A recent study highlights the first report of thermo-responsive rare-earth elements (REE)-selective protein. The ELP and the REE-binding domain are genetically fused to form REE-selective and thermo-responsive genetically encoded ELP called RELP for the selective extraction and recovery of total REEs. RELP shows a selective and repeatable biosorption platform for REE recovery. The authors highlighted that technology can be adapted to recover other precious metals and commodities.
