= Solution (chemistry) =

Homogeneous mixture of a solute and a solvent

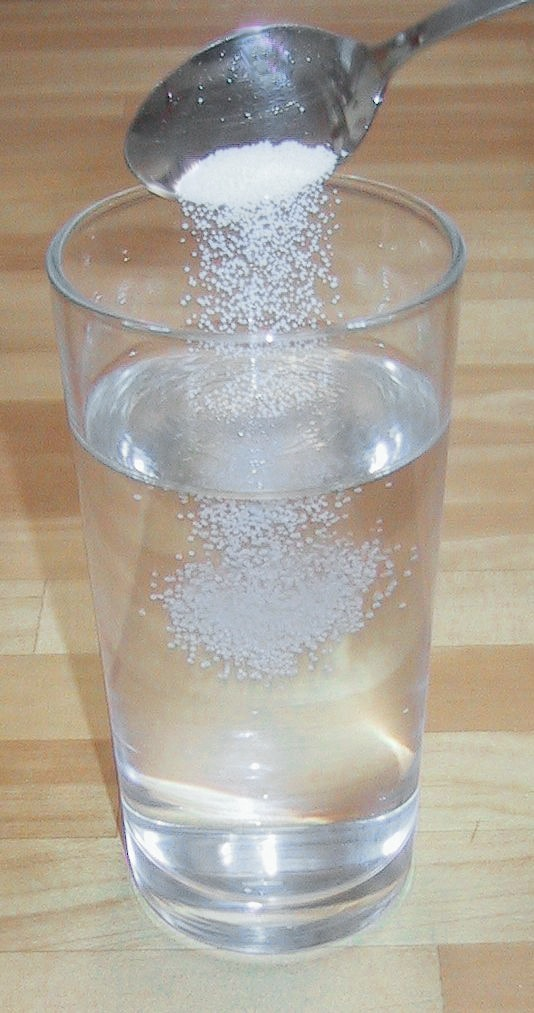
Making a saline water solution by dissolving table salt (NaCl) in water. The salt is the solute and the water the solvent.

In chemistry, a solution is defined by IUPAC as "A liquid or solid phase containing more than one substance, when for convenience one (or more) substance, which is called the solvent, is treated differently from the other substances, which are called solutes. When, as is often but not necessarily the case, the sum of the mole fractions of solutes is small compared with unity, the solution is called a dilute solution." One parameter of a solution is the concentration, which is a measure of the amount of solute in a given amount of solution or solvent. The term "aqueous solution" is used when one of the solvents is water.

== Types ==
Homogeneous means that the components of the mixture form a single phase. Heterogeneous means that the components of the mixture are of different phase. The properties of the mixture (such as concentration, temperature, and density) can be uniformly distributed through the volume but only in absence of diffusion phenomena or after their completion. Usually, the substance present in the greatest amount is considered the solvent. Solvents can be gases, liquids, or solids. One or more components present in the solution other than the solvent are called solutes. The solution has the same physical state as the solvent.

=== Gaseous mixtures ===
If the solvent is a gas, only gases (non-condensable) or vapours (condensable) are dissolved under a given set of conditions. An example of a gaseous solution is air (oxygen and other gases dissolved in nitrogen). Since interactions between gaseous molecules play almost no role, non-condensable gases form rather trivial solutions. In the literature, they are not even classified as solutions, but simply addressed as homogeneous mixtures of gases. The Brownian motion and the permanent molecular agitation of gas molecules guarantee the homogeneity of the gaseous systems. Non-condensable gaseous mixtures (e.g., air/CO_{2}, or air/xenon) do not spontaneously demix, nor sediment, as distinctly stratified and separate gas layers as a function of their relative density. Diffusion forces efficiently counteract gravitation forces under normal conditions prevailing on Earth. The case of condensable vapours is different: once the saturation vapor pressure at a given temperature is reached, vapour excess condenses into the liquid state.

=== Liquid solutions ===
Liquids dissolve gases, other liquids, and solids. An example of a dissolved gas is oxygen in water, which allows fish to breathe under water. An examples of a dissolved liquid is ethanol in water, as found in alcoholic beverages. An example of a dissolved solid is sugar water, which contains dissolved sucrose.

=== Solid solutions ===
If the solvent is a solid, then gases, liquids, and solids can be dissolved.

- Gas in solids:
  - Hydrogen dissolves rather well in metals, especially in palladium; this is studied as a means of hydrogen storage.
- Liquid in solid:
  - Mercury in gold, forming an amalgam
  - Water in solid salt or sugar, forming moist solids
  - Hexane in paraffin wax
  - Polymers containing plasticizers such as phthalate (liquid) in PVC (solid)
- Solid in solid:
  - Steel, basically a solution of carbon atoms in a crystalline matrix of iron atoms
  - Alloys like bronze and many others
  - Radium sulfate dissolved in barium sulfate: a true solid solution of Ra in BaSO_{4}

== Solubility ==
The ability of one compound to dissolve in another compound is called solubility. When a liquid can completely dissolve in another liquid the two liquids are miscible. Two substances that can never mix to form a solution are said to be immiscible.

All solutions have a positive entropy of mixing. The interactions between different molecules or ions may be energetically favoured or not. If interactions are unfavorable, then the free energy decreases with increasing solute concentration. At some point, the energy loss outweighs the entropy gain, and no more solute particles can be dissolved; the solution is said to be saturated. However, the point at which a solution can become saturated can change significantly with different environmental factors, such as temperature, pressure, and contamination. For some solute-solvent combinations, a supersaturated solution can be prepared by raising the solubility (for example by increasing the temperature) to dissolve more solute and then lowering it (for example by cooling).

Usually, the greater the temperature of the solvent, the more of a given solid solute it can dissolve. However, most gases and some compounds exhibit solubilities that decrease with increased temperature. Such behaviour is a result of an exothermic enthalpy of solution. Some surfactants exhibit this behaviour. The solubility of liquids in liquids is generally less temperature-sensitive than that of solids or gases.

== Properties ==
The physical properties of compounds such as melting point and boiling point change when other compounds are added. Together they are called colligative properties. There are several ways to quantify the amount of one compound dissolved in the other compounds collectively called concentration. Examples include molarity, volume fraction, and mole fraction.

The properties of ideal solutions can be calculated by the linear combination of the properties of its components. If both solute and solvent exist in equal quantities (such as in a 50% ethanol, 50% water solution), the concepts of "solute" and "solvent" become less relevant, but the substance that is more often used as a solvent is normally designated as the solvent (in this example, water).

== Liquid solution characteristics ==
In principle, all types of liquids can behave as solvents: liquid noble gases, molten metals, molten salts, molten covalent networks, and molecular liquids. In the practice of chemistry and biochemistry, most solvents are molecular liquids. They can be classified into polar and non-polar, according to whether their molecules possess a permanent electric dipole moment. Another distinction is whether their molecules can form hydrogen bonds (protic and aprotic solvents). Water, the most commonly used solvent, is both polar and sustains hydrogen bonds.

Water is a good solvent for some polar materials because water molecules are polar and capable of forming hydrogen bonds.

Salts dissolve in polar solvents, forming positive and negative ions that are attracted to the negative and positive ends of the solvent molecule, respectively. If the solvent is water, hydration occurs when the charged solute ions become surrounded by water molecules. A standard example is aqueous saltwater. Such solutions are called electrolytes. Whenever salt dissolves in water ion association has to be taken into account.

Polar solutes dissolve in polar solvents, forming polar bonds or hydrogen bonds. As an example, all alcoholic beverages are aqueous solutions of ethanol. On the other hand, non-polar solutes dissolve better in non-polar solvents.

An example of the immiscibility of oil and water is a leak of petroleum from a damaged tanker, that does not dissolve in the ocean water but rather floats on the surface.

== See also ==
- Coil–globule transition – Collapse of a macromolecule from an expanded coil state to a collapsed globule state
- Lower critical solution temperature – Temperature below which components of a mixture are miscible
- Molar solution – Measure of concentration of a chemical
- Percentage solution (disambiguation)
- Solubility equilibrium – Thermodynamic equilibrium between a solid and a solution of the same compound
- Suspension (chemistry) – Heterogeneous mixture of solid particles dispersed in a medium
- Total dissolved solids – Measurement in environmental chemistry
- Upper critical solution temperature – Critical temperature of miscibility in a mixture
