= Wohl model =

Wohl model may refer to:

- Wohl equation of state: an empirical model for a real gas proposed by A. Wohl
- an empirical model for the excess Gibbs free energy of mixing which has been formulated for ternary solutions by K. Wohl (1946, 1953)
