= UCST =

UCST may refer to:

- United Church Schools Trust, a UK educational charity
- Upper critical solution temperature, in chemistry
