= Maurice Loyal Huggins =

American scientist

Maurice Loyal Huggins (September 19, 1897, Berkeley, California – December 17, 1981) was a scientist who independently conceived the idea of hydrogen bonding and who was an early advocate for their role in stabilizing protein secondary structure. An important polymer theory, Flory–Huggins theory, is also named after him.

== Controversies over the hydrogen bond ==
Huggins believed that he had been the first to suggest the concept of the hydrogen bond, while he was a student under G. N. Lewis at the Chemical Laboratory of the University of California, Berkeley. According to his account, he wrote a thesis in 1919 in which the H-bond was introduced and applied to tautomerism in acetoacetic acid. Unfortunately, no hard copy of the thesis remains. The first extant publication of the H-bond was that of Wendell Latimer and Worth Rodebush in 1920, who cite Huggins' unpublished work in a footnote. (They were fellow scientists at the Chemical Laboratory.)

== Structure of the peptide bond ==
In 1937, Huggins analyzed the β-sheet models of William Astbury and realized that the hydrogen bonding could not work as described since the bond geometry of the amide nitrogen (then presumed to be tetrahedral) would deflect the hydrogen away from the carbonyl oxygen. He further suggested that resonance might play a role in changing the geometry of the peptide bond to make the hydrogen bonds more linear. However, he did not state explicitly that the peptide bond was planar, as emphasized by Pauling in a nearly simultaneous paper.

== Structure of the α-helix ==
Huggins also produced a model of the α-helix in 1943, roughly eight years ahead of the modern model of Linus Pauling, Robert Corey and Herman Branson.

== Personal history ==
Huggins was born in 1897 to Amos Williamson Huggins and Mary Abigail Hackley. He had at least two sisters, Dorothea Harriet Huggins (born September 22, 1894) and Mary Abigail Huggins (born October 2, 1904). He earned his Ph.D. in 1922 under Charles Walter Porter (known as Walter Porter) in the Chemistry Laboratory of the University of California, Berkeley. In 1941 he was elected a Fellow of the American Physical Society. He was employed as a chemist by Eastman Kodak Research Laboratories.

== Sources ==
- Latimer WM and Rodebush WH. (1920) "Polarity and Ionization from the Standpoint of the Lewis Theory of Valence", J. Am. Chem. Soc., 42, 1419–1433.
- Huggins ML. (1936) J. Org. Chem., 1, 407–456.
- Pauling L and Niemann C. (1939) J. Am. Chem. Soc., 61, 1860–1867.
- Huggins M. (1943) "The structure of fibrous proteins", Chem. Rev., 32, 195–218.
- Huggins ML. (1971) Angew. Chem. Int. Ed., 10, 147–152.
- Huggins ML. (1980) Chem. Tech., 10, 422.
