= Coil–globule transition =

Collapse of a macromolecule from an expanded coil state to a collapsed globule state

In polymer physics, the coil–globule transition is the collapse of a macromolecule from an expanded coil state through an ideal coil state to a collapsed globule state, or vice versa. The coil–globule transition is of importance in biology due to the presence of coil-globule transitions in biological macromolecules such as proteins and DNA. It is also analogous with the swelling behavior of a crosslinked polymer gel and is thus of interest in biomedical engineering for controlled drug delivery. A particularly prominent example of a polymer possessing a coil-globule transition of interest in this area is that of Poly(N-isopropylacrylamide) (PNIPAAm).

== Description ==
In its coil state, the radius of gyration of the macromolecule scales as its chain length to the three-fifths power. As it passes through the coil–globule transition, it shifts to scaling as chain length to the half power (at the transition) and finally to the one third power in the collapsed state. The direction of the transition is often specified by the constructions 'coil-to-globule' or 'globule-to-coil' transition.

== Origin ==
This transition is associated with the transition of a polymer chain from good solvent behavior through ideal or theta solvent behavior to poor solvent behavior. The canonical coil–globule transition is associated with the Upper critical solution temperature and the associated Flory theta point. In this case, collapse occurs with cooling and results from favorable attractive energy of the polymer to itself. A second type of coil–globule transition is instead associated with the lower critical solution temperature and its corresponding theta point. This collapse occurs with increasing temperature and is driven by an unfavorable entropy of mixing. An example of this type is embodied by the polymer PNIPAAM, mentioned above. Coil globule transitions may also be driven by charge effects, in the case of polyelectrolytes. In this case pH and ionic strength changes within the solution may trigger collapse, with increasing counterion concentration generally leading to collapse in a uniformly charged polyelectrolyte. In polyampholytes containing both positive and negative charges, the opposite may hold true.

== See also ==
- Upper critical solution temperature
- Lower critical solution temperature
- Critical point
- Ideal solution
