= Percentage solution =

Percentage solution may refer to:

- Mass fraction (or "% w/w" or "wt.%"), for percent mass
- Volume fraction (or "% v/v" or "vol.%"), volume concentration, for percent volume
- "Mass/volume percentage" (or "% m/v") in biology, for mass per unit volume; incorrectly used to denote mass concentration (chemistry). See usage in biology
