= Phase rule =

General principle in thermodynamics regarding pVT systems in equilibrium

In thermodynamics, the phase rule is a general principle governing multi-component, multi-phase systems in thermodynamic equilibrium. For a system without chemical reactions, it relates the number of freely varying intensive properties (F) to the number of components (C), the number of phases (P), and number of ways of performing work on the system (N):

$$F = N + C - P + 1$$

Examples of intensive properties that count toward F are the temperature and pressure. For simple liquids and gases, pressure-volume work is the only type of work, in which case N = 1.

The rule was derived by American physicist Josiah Willard Gibbs in his landmark paper titled On the Equilibrium of Heterogeneous Substances, published in parts between 1875 and 1878.

The number of degrees of freedom F (also called the variance) is the number of independent intensive properties, i.e., the largest number of thermodynamic parameters such as temperature or pressure that can be varied simultaneously and independently of each other.

An example of a one-component system (C = 1) is a pure chemical. A two-component system (C = 2) has two chemically independent components, like a mixture of water and ethanol. Examples of phases that count toward P are solids, liquids and gases.

== Foundations ==
- A phase is a form of matter that is homogeneous in chemical composition and physical state. Typical phases are solid, liquid and gas. Two immiscible liquids (or liquid mixtures with different compositions) separated by a distinct boundary are counted as two different phases, as are two immiscible solids.
- The number of components (C) is the number of chemically independent constituents of the system, i.e. the minimum number of independent species necessary to define the composition of all phases of the system.
- The number of degrees of freedom (F) in this context is the number of intensive variables which are independent of each other.

The basis for the rule is that equilibrium between phases places a constraint on the intensive variables. More rigorously, since the phases are in thermodynamic equilibrium with each other, the chemical potentials of the phases must be equal. The number of equality relationships determines the number of degrees of freedom. For example, if the chemical potentials of a liquid and of its vapour depend on temperature (T) and pressure (p), the equality of chemical potentials will mean that each of those variables will be dependent on the other. Mathematically, the equation μ_{liq}(T, p) = μ_{vap}(T, p), where μ, the chemical potential, defines temperature as a function of pressure or vice versa. (Caution: do not confuse p as pressure with P, number of phases.)

To be more specific, the composition of each phase is determined by C − 1 intensive variables (such as mole fractions) in each phase. The total number of variables is (C − 1)P + 2, where the extra two are temperature T and pressure p. The number of constraints is C(P − 1), since the chemical potential of each component must be equal in all phases. Subtract the number of constraints from the number of variables to obtain the number of degrees of freedom as F = (C − 1)P + 2 − C(P − 1) = C − P + 2.

The rule is valid provided the equilibrium between phases is not influenced by gravitational, electrical or magnetic forces, or by surface area, and only by temperature, pressure, and concentration.

== Consequences and examples ==
=== Pure substances (one component) ===
For pure substances C = 1 so that F = 3 − P. In a single phase (P = 1) condition of a pure component system, two variables (F = 2), such as temperature and pressure, can be chosen independently to be any pair of values consistent with the phase. However, if the temperature and pressure combination ranges to a point where the pure component undergoes a separation into two phases (P = 2), F decreases from 2 to 1. When the system enters the two-phase region, it is no longer possible to independently control temperature and pressure.

Carbon dioxide pressure-temperature phase diagram showing the triple point and critical point of carbon dioxide

In the phase diagram to the right, the boundary curve between the liquid and gas regions maps the constraint between temperature and pressure when the single-component system has separated into liquid and gas phases at equilibrium. The only way to increase the pressure on the two phase line is by increasing the temperature. If the temperature is decreased by cooling, some of the gas condenses, decreasing the pressure. Throughout both processes, the temperature and pressure stay in the relationship shown by this boundary curve unless one phase is entirely consumed by evaporation or condensation, or unless the critical point is reached. As long as there are two phases, there is only one degree of freedom, which corresponds to the position along the phase boundary curve.

The critical point is the black dot at the end of the liquid–gas boundary. As this point is approached, the liquid and gas phases become progressively more similar until, at the critical point, there is no longer a separation into two phases. Above the critical point and away from the phase boundary curve, F = 2 and the temperature and pressure can be controlled independently. Hence there is only one phase, and it has the physical properties of a dense gas, but is also referred to as a supercritical fluid.

Of the other two-boundary curves, one is the solid–liquid boundary or melting point curve which indicates the conditions for equilibrium between these two phases, and the other at lower temperature and pressure is the solid–gas boundary.

Even for a pure substance, it is possible that three phases, such as solid, liquid and vapour, can exist together in equilibrium (P = 3). If there is only one component, there are no degrees of freedom (F = 0) when there are three phases. Therefore, in a single-component system, this three-phase mixture can only exist at a single temperature and pressure, which is known as a triple point. Here there are two equations μ_{sol}(T, p) = μ_{liq}(T, p) = μ_{vap}(T, p), which are sufficient to determine the two variables T and p. In the diagram for CO_{2} the triple point is the point at which the solid, liquid and gas phases come together, at 5.2 bar and 217 K. It is also possible for other sets of phases to form a triple point, for example in the water system there is a triple point where ice I, ice III and liquid can coexist.

If four phases of a pure substance were in equilibrium (P = 4), the phase rule would give F = −1, which is meaningless, since there cannot be −1 independent variables. This explains the fact that four phases of a pure substance (such as ice I, ice III, liquid water and water vapour) are not found in equilibrium at any temperature and pressure. In terms of chemical potentials there are now three equations, which cannot in general be satisfied by any values of the two variables T and p, although in principle they might be solved in a special case where one equation is mathematically dependent on the other two. In practice, however, the coexistence of more phases than allowed by the phase rule normally means that the phases are not all in true equilibrium.

=== Two-component systems ===
For binary mixtures of two chemically independent components, C = 2 so that F = 4 − P. In addition to temperature and pressure, the other degree of freedom is the composition of each phase, often expressed as mole fraction or mass fraction of one component.

Boiling Point Diagram

As an example, consider the system of two completely miscible liquids such as toluene and benzene, in equilibrium with their vapours. This system may be described by a boiling-point diagram which shows the composition (mole fraction) of the two phases in equilibrium as functions of temperature (at a fixed pressure).

Four thermodynamic variables which may describe the system include temperature (T), pressure (p), mole fraction of component 1 (toluene) in the liquid phase (x_{1L}), and mole fraction of component 1 in the vapour phase (x_{1V}). However, since two phases are present (P = 2) in equilibrium, only two of these variables can be independent (F = 2). This is because the four variables are constrained by two relations: the equality of the chemical potentials of liquid toluene and toluene vapour, and the corresponding equality for benzene.

For given T and p, there will be two phases at equilibrium when the overall composition of the system (system point) lies in between the two curves. A horizontal line (isotherm or tie line) can be drawn through any such system point, and intersects the curve for each phase at its equilibrium composition. The quantity of each phase is given by the lever rule (expressed in the variable corresponding to the x-axis, here mole fraction).

For the analysis of fractional distillation, the two independent variables are instead considered to be liquid-phase composition (x_{1L}) and pressure. In that case the phase rule implies that the equilibrium temperature (boiling point) and vapour-phase composition are determined.

Liquid–vapour phase diagrams for other systems may have azeotropes (maxima or minima) in the composition curves, but the application of the phase rule is unchanged. The only difference is that the compositions of the two phases are equal exactly at the azeotropic composition.

=== Aqueous solution of 4 kinds of salts ===
Consider an aqueous solution containing sodium chloride (NaCl), potassium chloride (KCl), sodium bromide (NaBr), and potassium bromide (KBr), in equilibrium with their respective solid phases. Each salt, in solid form, is a different phase, because each possesses a distinct crystal structure and composition. The aqueous solution itself is another phase, because it forms a homogeneous liquid phase separate from the solid salts, with its own distinct composition and physical properties. Thus we have P = 5 phases.

There are 6 elements present (H, O, Na, K, Cl, Br), but we have 2 constraints:

- The stoichiometry of water: n(H) = 2n(O).
- Charge balance in the solution: n(Na) + n(K) = n(Cl) + n(Br).

giving C = 6 - 2 = 4 components. The Gibbs phase rule states that F = 1. So, for example, if we plot the P-T phase diagram of the system, there is only one line at which all phases coexist. Any deviation from the line would either cause one of the salts to completely dissolve or one of the ions to completely precipitate from the solution.

== Phase rule at constant pressure ==
For applications in materials science dealing with phase changes between different solid structures, pressure is often imagined to be constant (for example at 1 atmosphere), and is ignored as a degree of freedom, so the formula becomes:

$$F = C - P + 1$$

This is sometimes incorrectly called the "condensed phase rule", but it is not applicable to condensed systems subject to high pressures (for example, in geology), since the effects of these pressures are important.

== Phase rule in colloidal mixtures ==
In colloidal mixtures quintuple and sixtuple points have been described in violation of Gibbs phase rule but it is argued that in these systems the rule can be generalized to $F =M+ C - P + 1$ where $M$ accounts for additional parameters of interaction among the components like the diameter of one type of particle in relation to the diameter of the other particles in the solution.
