= Spinodal =

Concept in thermodynamics

A phase diagram displaying spinodal curves, within the binodal coexistence curves and two critical points: an upper and lower critical solution temperature.

In thermodynamics, the limit of local stability against phase separation with respect to small fluctuations is clearly defined by the condition that the second derivative of Gibbs free energy is zero.

$${\operatorname{d}^2\!G\over\operatorname{d}\!x^2} {{=}} 0$$

The locus of these points (the inflection point within a G-x or G-c curve, Gibbs free energy as a function of composition) is known as the spinodal curve. For compositions within this curve, infinitesimally small fluctuations in composition and density will lead to phase separation via spinodal decomposition. Outside of the curve, the solution will be at least metastable with respect to fluctuations. In other words, outside the spinodal curve some careful process may obtain a single phase system. Inside it, only processes far from thermodynamic equilibrium, such as physical vapor deposition, will enable one to prepare single phase compositions. The local points of coexisting compositions, defined by the common tangent construction, are known as a binodal coexistence curve, which denotes the minimum-energy equilibrium state of the system. Increasing temperature results in a decreasing difference between mixing entropy and mixing enthalpy, and thus the coexisting compositions come closer. The binodal curve forms the basis for the miscibility gap in a phase diagram. The free energy of mixing changes with temperature and concentration, and the binodal and spinodal meet at the critical or consolute temperature and composition.

== Criterion ==
For binary solutions, the thermodynamic criterion which defines the spinodal curve is that the second derivative of free energy with respect to density or some composition variable is zero.

== Critical point ==
Extrema of the spinodal in a temperature vs composition plot coincide with those of the binodal curve, and are known as critical points. The spinodal itself can be thought of as a line of pseudocritical points, with the correlation function taking a scaling form with non-classical critical exponents. Strictly speaking, a spinodal is defined as a mean field theoretic object. As such, the spinodal does not exist in real systems, but one can extrapolate to infer the existence of a pseudospinodal that exhibits critical-like behavior such as critical slowing down.

=== Isothermal liquid-liquid equilibria ===
In the case of ternary isothermal liquid-liquid equilibria, the spinodal curve (obtained from the Hessian matrix) and the corresponding critical point can be used to help the experimental data correlation process.
