= Binodal =

Graphical curve that denotes a point at which two distinct phases coexist

A phase diagram displaying binodal (coexistence) curves as well as spinodal curves, and lower (LCST) and upper (UCST) critical solution temperatures.

In thermodynamics, the binodal, also known as the coexistence curve or binodal curve, denotes the state of a multi-component system at which the system's distinct phases straddle between coexistence or miscibility. Equivalently, it is the boundary on which thermodynamics favors the system components to dissolve or separate into two phases. In general, the binodal is defined by the condition at which the chemical potential of all solution components is equal in each phase. The extremum of a binodal curve in temperature coincides with the extremum of the spinodal curve, and is known as a critical point.

== Binary systems ==
In binary (two component) mixtures, the binodal can be determined at a given temperature by drawing a tangent line to the free energy.
