= Congruence =

Congruence may refer to:

== Mathematics ==
- Congruence (geometry), being the same size and shape
- Congruence or congruence relation, in abstract algebra, an equivalence relation on an algebraic structure that is compatible with the structure
- In modular arithmetic, having the same remainder when divided by a specified integer
  - Ramanujan's congruences, congruences for the partition function, p(n), first discovered by Ramanujan in 1919
  - Congruence subgroup, a subgroup defined by congruence conditions on the entries of a matrix group with integer entries
  - Congruence of squares, in number theory, a congruence commonly used in integer factorization algorithms
- Matrix congruence, an equivalence relation between two matrices
- Congruence (manifolds), in the theory of smooth manifolds, the set of integral curves defined by a nonvanishing vector field defined on the manifold
- Congruence (general relativity), in general relativity, a congruence in a four-dimensional Lorentzian manifold that is interpreted physically as a model of spacetime or a bundle of world lines
- Zeller's congruence, an algorithm to calculate the day of the week for any date
- Scissors congruence, related to Hilbert's third problem

== Mineralogy and chemistry ==
In mineralogy and chemistry, the term congruent (or incongruent) may refer to:

- Congruent dissolution: substances dissolve congruently when the composition of the solid and the dissolved solute stoichiometrically match
- Congruent melting occurs during melting of a compound when the composition of the liquid that forms is the same as the composition of the solid
- Incongruent transition, in chemistry, is a mass transition between two phases which involves a change in chemical composition

== Psychology ==
- In Carl Rogers' personality theory, the compliance between ideal self and actual self; see Carl Rogers § Incongruity
- Mood congruence between feeling or emotion (in psychiatry and psychology)
- Incongruity theory of humor

== See also ==
- Congruence bias, a type of cognitive bias, similar to confirmation bias
- Congruence principle (disambiguation)
- Hatch mark, geometric notation for congruent line segments
- ≅
- ≡ (disambiguation)
- ≃
