= Miedema's model =

Miedema's model is a semi-empirical approach for estimating the heat of formation of solid or liquid metal alloys and compounds in the framework of thermodynamic calculations for metals and minerals. It was developed by the Dutch scientist Andries Rinse Miedema (15 November 1933 – 28 May 1992) while working at Philips Natuurkundig Laboratorium. It may provide or confirm basic enthalpy data needed for the calculation of phase diagrams of metals, via CALPHAD or ab initio quantum chemistry methods. For a binary system composed by elements A and B, a generic Miedema Formula could be cast as $\Delta H = f(Element A, \phi_A, n_{WS,A}, V_A, ElementB, \phi_B, n_{WS,B}, V_B)$ where terms $\phi$ and $n_{WS}$ are explained and reported below. For a binary system the physical picture could be simplified by considering a relatively simpler function of the difference of these three physical parameters $\Delta H = f(\phi_A - \phi_B, n_{WS,A} - n_{WS,B}, V_A - V_B)$ resulting in a more complex form: $\Delta H = x_A \left(2 f_B^A V^{2/3}_{A,alloy} \times \frac{-P (\Delta \phi^*)^2 + Q (\Delta n_{WS}^{1/3})^2 - R}{(n_{WS}^A)^{1/3} + (n_{WS}^B)^{1/3}} + \Delta H^{trans} \right)$.

== History ==
Miedema introduced his approach in several papers, beginning in 1973 in Philips Technical Review Magazine with "A simple model for alloys".

Miedema described his motivation with "Reliable rules for the alloying behaviour of metals have long been sought. There is the qualitative rule that states that the greater the difference in the electronegativity of two metals, the greater the heat of formation - and hence the stability. Then there is the Hume-Rothery rule, which states that two metals that differ by more than 15% in their atomic radius will not form substitutional solid solutions. This rule can only be used reliably (90 % success) to predict poor solubility; it cannot predict good solubility. The author has proposed a simple atomic model, which is empirical like the other two rules, but nevertheless has a clear physical basis and predicts the alloying behaviour of transition metals accurately in 98 % of cases. The model is very suitable for graphical presentation of the data and is therefore easy to use in practice."

Free web based applications include Entall and Miedema Calculator. The latter was reviewed and improved in 2016, with an extension of the method. The original Algol program was ported to Fortran.

== Informatics-guided classification of miscible and immiscible binary alloy systems ==
Miedema's approach has been applied to the classification of miscible and immiscible systems of binary alloys. These are relevant in the design of multicomponent alloys. A comprehensive classification of alloying behavior for 813 binary alloy systems consisting of transition and lanthanide metals. "Impressively, the classification by the miscibility map yields a robust validation on the capability of the well-known Miedema’s theory (95% agreement) and shows good agreement with the HTFP method (90% agreement)." These 2017 results demonstrate that "a state-of-the art physics-guided data mining can provide an efficient pathway for knowledge discovery in the next generation of materials design".

== Appendix: Basic Miedema Model Parameters ==
This table reports the three main Miedema parameters for the elements of the periodic table for whom the model is applicable.

Element	
$\phi$	Volt
$n_{WS}$	(density units)$^{1/3}$
$V^{2/3}$	cm

	Group	1	2	3	4	5	6	7	8	9	10	11	12	13	14	15
Period																
		1														
1		H														
		5,2														
		1,5														
		1,42														
		3	4											5	6	7
2		Li	Be											B	C	N
		2,85	5,05											5,3	6,24	6,86
		0,98	1,670											1,750	1,770	1,650
		5,53	2,88											2,8	2,2	4,15
		11	12											13	14	15
3		Na	Mg											Al	Si	P
		2,7	3,45											4,2	4,7	5,55
		0,820	1,170											1,390	1,500	1,650
		8,27	5,81											4,64	4,2	4,15
		19	20	21	22	23	24	25	26	27	28	29	30	31	32	33
4		K	Ca	Sc	Ti	V	Cr	Mn	Fe	Co	Ni	Cu	Zn	Ga	Ge	As
		2,25	2,55	3,25	3,8	4,25	4,65	4,45	4,93	5,1	5,2	4,45	4,1	4,1	4,55	4,8
		0,650	0,910	1,270	1,520	1,640	1,730	1,610	1,770	1,750	1,750	1,470	1,320	1,310	1,370	1,440
		12,77	8,82	6,09	4,12	4,12	3,74	3,78	3,69	3,55	3,52	3,7	4,38	5,19	4,6	5,2
		37	38	39	40	41	42	43	44	45	46	47	48	49	50	51
5		Rb	Sr	Y	Zr	Nb	Mo	Tc	Ru	Rh	Pd	Ag	Cd	In	Sn	Sb
		2,1	2,4	3,2	3,45	4,05	4,65	5,3	5,4	5,4	5,45	4,35	4,05	3,9	4,15	4,4
		0,600	0,840	1,210	1,410	1,640	1,770	1,810	1,830	1,760	1,670	1,360	1,240	1,170	1,240	1,260
		14,65	10,48	7,34	5,81	4,89	4,45	4,21	4,6	4,1	4,29	4,72	5,53	6,28	6,43	6,6
		55	56	71	72	73	74	75	76	77	78	79	80	81	82	83
6		Cs	Ba	Lu	Hf	Ta	W	Re	Os	Ir	Pt	Au	Hg	Tl	Pb	Bi
		1,95	2,32		3,6	4,05	4,8	5,2	5,4	5,55	5,65	5,15	4,2	3,9	4,1	4,15
		0,550	0,810		1,450	1,630	1,810	1,850	1,850	1,830	1,780	1,570	1,240	1,120	1,150	1,160
		16,86	11,32		5,65	4,89	4,5	4,28	4,15	4,17	4,36	4,7	5,83	6,67	6,94	7,2

The above list of parameters should be considered as a starting point, which could yield such data (results after Fortran program made available by Emre Sururi Tasci):

6 Fe Phi: 4.93V Nws: 5.55d.u. Vmole: 7.09cm3 DeltaHtrans: 0kJ/mole M AM5 AM3 AM2 AM MA2 MA3 MA5 AinM AM MinA Sc -6 -9 -12 -17 -16 -13 -9 -39 -11 -53 Ti -10 -15 -20 -25 -22 -18 -12 -62 -17 -74 V -4 -7 -9 -11 -9 -7 -5 -28 -7 -29 Cr -1 -1 -2 -2 -2 -1 -1 -6 -1 -6 Mn 0 0 0 0 0 0 0 1 0 1 Fe 0 0 0 0 0 0 0 0 0 0 Co 0 -1 -1 -1 -1 -1 0 -2 -1 -2 Ni -1 -2 -2 -2 -2 -1 -1 -6 -2 -6 Y -1 -1 -1 -2 -2 -1 -1 -4 -1 -6 Zr -13 -20 -27 -37 -34 -28 -19 -85 -25 -118 Nb -9 -14 -18 -23 -21 -17 -11 -57 -16 -70 Mo -1 -2 -2 -3 -3 -2 -1 -7 -2 -9 Tc -2 -3 -4 -5 -4 -3 -2 -11 -3 -13 Ru -3 -4 -5 -7 -6 -5 -3 -17 -5 -20 Rh -3 -5 -6 -8 -7 -5 -4 -20 -5 -23 Pd -2 -4 -5 -6 -6 -4 -3 -16 -4 -19 La 2 3 4 6 7 6 4 14 5 25 Ce 1 2 3 4 4 3 2 8 3 14 Pr 0 1 1 1 1 1 1 2 1 4 Nd 0 1 1 1 1 1 1 2 1 4 Pm -1 -2 -2 -3 -3 -2 -2 -6 -2 -11 Sm -1 -1 -1 -2 -2 -1 -1 -4 -1 -6 EuII 14 22 29 42 44 38 26 91 30 160 EuIII 79 71 63 46 30 23 15 999 47 90 Gd -1 -1 -1 -2 -2 -1 -1 -4 -1 -6 Tb -1 -2 -3 -4 -4 -3 -2 -9 -3 -15 Dy -1 -2 -3 -4 -4 -3 -2 -9 -3 -15 Ho -1 -2 -2 -3 -3 -2 -2 -7 -2 -10 Er -2 -4 -5 -7 -7 -5 -4 -15 -5 -23 Tm -2 -4 -5 -7 -6 -5 -4 -15 -5 -23 YbII 12 18 25 35 36 29 20 77 25 124 YbIII 32 27 23 14 7 5 3 999 16 18 Lu -4 -6 -7 -10 -10 -8 -6 -23 -7 -35 Hf -11 -17 -23 -30 -28 -23 -16 -71 -21 -98 Ta -9 -13 -17 -22 -20 -16 -11 -54 -15 -67 W 0 0 0 0 0 0 0 0 0 0 Re 0 0 0 0 0 0 0 -1 0 -1 OS -2 -4 -5 -6 -5 -4 -3 -15 -4 -17 Ir -5 -8 -10 -13 -12 -9 -6 -32 -9 -38 Pt -7 -11 -15 -19 -17 -14 -9 -47 -13 -58 Th -5 -8 -11 -15 -15 -13 -9 -33 -11 -58 U -6 -9 -12 -16 -15 -12 -8 -38 -11 -53 Pu -4 -5 -7 -9 -8 -7 -5 -22 -6 -29 Cu 8 13 16 19 16 12 8 53 13 50 Ag 16 25 32 42 37 29 20 102 28 123 Au 5 7 9 12 11 9 6 28 8 37 H 46 26 13 4 2 2 1 999 27 34 Li 15 23 30 38 31 23 15 96 26 94 Na 31 47 63 89 86 68 46 195 62 276 K 35 53 70 106 121 106 73 221 81 432 Rb 35 53 70 106 127 116 82 221 83 476 cs 40 58 76 113 151 169 186 219 111 999 Be -8 -12 -15 -16 -12 -9 -6 -44 -9 -31 Mg 9 13 17 23 21 16 11 61 18 78 Ca 12 18 25 36 37 30 21 77 25 128 Sr 16 24 32 47 51 44 31 99 34 190 Ba 17 25 33 49 55 49 35 103 37 212 Zn -2 -3 -4 -5 -4 -3 -2 14 4 14 Cd 5 8 10 14 12 10 7 58 17 77 Hg 8 12 15 21 20 16 11 74 22 106 B -1 -16 -28 -38 -30 -23 -15 999 -11 -65 Al -13 -19 -25 -32 -28 -22 -15 -41 -11 -48 Ga -7 -10 -14 -18 -16 -13 -9 -6 -2 -8 In 5 7 9 13 12 10 7 63 19 95 Tl 10 16 21 30 29 24 17 99 31 160 C 38 12 -7 -20 -15 -11 -8 999 8 -28 Si 11 -1 -12 -26 -26 -21 -14 -67 -18 -75 Ge 12 6 0 -9 -11 -9 -6 -12 -3 -15 Sn -1 -1 -1 -2 -2 -2 -1 34 11 56 Pb 9 13 17 25 25 22 15 91 29 160 N 127 74 31 -17 -20 -15 -10 999 36 -43 P -17 -34 -50 -70 -63 -50 -34 999 -31 -156 As -15 -23 -30 -40 -38 -31 -21 -49 -14 -68 Sb -1 -2 -3 -4 -4 -4 -3 33 10 57 Bi 6 9 12 18 19 16 11 80 26 146

Improved data may be found in more recent publications; possibly, in the near future, improvement or insight of these data could be provided by the extended Calphad databases open collections available at NIMS. For instance for Fe-X binary phase diagrams:

Binary Iron Systems			
Fe-Ag	Fe-Gd	Fe-P	Fe-Tm
Fe-Al	Fe-H	Fe-Pr	Fe-V
Fe-Au	Fe-Ho	Fe-Pt	Fe-Yb
Fe-B	Fe-Ir	Fe-Sb	Fe-Zn
Fe-C	Fe-La	Fe-Sc	Fe-Zr
Fe-Cd	Fe-Lu	Fe-Si	
Fe-Ce	Fe-Mn	Fe-Sm	
Fe-Co	Fe-Mo	Fe-Sn	
Fe-Cr	Fe-N	Fe-Ta	
Fe-Cu	Fe-Nd	Fe-Tb	
Fe-Dy	Fe-Ni	Fe-Th	

== See also ==
- Phase diagram
- Gibbs energy
- CALPHAD
- Intermetallic compound
- Enthalpy of mixing
- Computational thermodynamics
