= Optical scalars =

Set of three scalar functions

In general relativity, optical scalars refer to a set of three scalar functions $\{ \hat\theta$ (expansion), $\hat\sigma$ (shear) and $\hat\omega$ (twist/rotation/vorticity)$\}$ describing the propagation of a geodesic null congruence.

In fact, these three scalars $\{ \hat\theta\,,\hat\sigma\,, \hat\omega \}$ can be defined for both timelike and null geodesic congruences in an identical spirit, but they are called "optical scalars" only for the null case. Also, it is their tensorial predecessors $\{ \hat\theta \hat h_{ab}\,,\hat\sigma_{ab}\,, \hat\omega_{ab} \}$ that are adopted in tensorial equations, while the scalars $\{ \hat\theta\,,\hat\sigma\,, \hat\omega \}$ mainly show up in equations written in the language of Newman–Penrose formalism.

== Definitions: expansion, shear and twist ==
=== For geodesic timelike congruences ===
Denote the tangent vector field of an observer's worldline (in a timelike congruence) as $Z^a$, and then one could construct induced "spatial metrics" that

$(1)\quad h^{ab}=g^{ab}+Z^a Z^b\;,\quad h_{ab}=g_{ab}+Z_a Z_b\;,\quad h^a_{\;\;b}=\delta^a_{\;\;b}+Z^a Z_b\;,$

where $h^a_{\;\;b}$ works as a spatially projecting operator. Use $h^a_{\;\;b}$ to project the coordinate covariant derivative $\nabla_b Z_a$ and one obtains the "spatial" auxiliary tensor $B_{ab}$,

$(2)\quad B_{ab}=h^c_{\;\;a}\, h^d_{\;\;b}\, \nabla_d Z_c = \nabla_b Z_a +A_a Z_b\;,$

where $A_a$ represents the four-acceleration, and $B_{ab}$ is purely spatial in the sense that $B_{ab}Z^a=B_{ab}Z^b=0$. Specifically for an observer with a geodesic timelike worldline, we have

$(3)\quad A_a=0\;,\quad\Rightarrow\quad B_{ab}= \nabla_b Z_a\;.$

Now decompose $B_{ab}$ into its symmetric and antisymmetric parts $\theta_{ab}$ and $\omega_{ab}$,

$(4)\quad \theta_{ab}=B_{(ab)}\;,\quad \omega_{ab}=B_{[ab]}\;.$

$\omega_{ab}=B_{[ab]}$ is trace-free ($g^{ab}\omega_{ab}=0$) while $\theta_{ab}$ has nonzero trace, $g^{ab}\theta_{ab}=\theta$. Thus, the symmetric part $\theta_{ab}$ can be further rewritten into its trace and trace-free part,

$(5)\quad \theta_{ab}=\frac{1}{3}\theta h_{ab} +\sigma_{ab}\;.$

Hence, all in all we have

$(6)\quad B_{ab}=\frac{1}{3}\theta h_{ab} +\sigma_{ab}+\omega_{ab}\;,\quad \theta=g^{ab}\theta_{ab}=g^{ab}B_{(ab)}\;,\quad \sigma_{ab}=\theta_{ab}-\frac{1}{3}\theta h_{ab}\;,\quad \omega_{ab}=B_{[ab]}\;.$

=== For geodesic null congruences ===
Now, consider a geodesic null congruence with tangent vector field $k^a$. Similar to the timelike situation, we also define

$(7)\quad \hat{B}_{ab}:= \nabla_b k_a\;,$

which can be decomposed into

$(8)\quad \hat B_{ab}=\hat\theta_{ab}+\hat\omega_{ab}=\frac{1}{2}\hat\theta \hat h_{ab}+\hat\sigma_{ab}+\hat\omega_{ab}\;,$

where

$(9)\quad \hat\theta_{ab}=\hat B_{(ab)}\;,\quad \hat\theta=\hat h^{ab} \hat B_{ab}\;,\quad \hat\sigma_{ab}=\hat B_{(ab)}-\frac{1}{2}\hat\theta \hat h_{ab}\;,\quad \hat\omega_{ab}=\hat B_{[ab]}\;.$

Here, "hatted" quantities are utilized to stress that these quantities for null congruences are two-dimensional as opposed to the three-dimensional timelike case. However, if we only discuss null congruences in a paper, the hats can be omitted for simplicity.

== Definitions: optical scalars for null congruences ==
The optical scalars $\{ \hat\theta\,,\hat\sigma\,, \hat\omega \}$ come straightforwardly from "scalarization" of the tensors $\{ \hat\theta\,,\hat\sigma_{ab}\,, \hat\omega_{ab} \}$ in Eq(9).

The expansion of a geodesic null congruence is defined by (where for clearance we will adopt another standard symbol "$;$" to denote the covariant derivative $\nabla_a$)

$(10)\quad \hat\theta = \frac{1}{2}\, k^a{}_{;\,a} \;.$

Comparison with the "expansion rates of a null congruence": As shown in the article "Expansion rate of a null congruence", the outgoing and ingoing expansion rates, denoted by $\theta_{(\ell)}$ and $\theta_{(n)}$ respectively, are defined by

$(A.1)\quad \theta_{(\ell)}:=h^{ab}\nabla_a l_b\;,$

$(A.2)\quad \theta_{(n)}:=h^{ab}\nabla_a n_b\;,$

where $h^{ab}=g^{ab}+l^a n^b+n^a l^b$ represents the induced metric. Also, $\theta_{(\ell)}$ and $\theta_{(n)}$ can be calculated via

$(A.3)\quad \theta_{(\ell)}=g^{ab}\nabla_a l_b -\kappa_{(\ell)}\;,$

$(A.4)\quad \theta_{(n)}=g^{ab}\nabla_a n_b -\kappa_{(n)}\;,$

where $\kappa_{(\ell)}$ and $\kappa_{(n)}$ are respectively the outgoing and ingoing non-affinity coefficients defined by

$(A.5)\quad l^a\nabla_a l_b=\kappa_{(\ell)}l_b\;,$

$(A.6)\quad n^a\nabla_a n_b=\kappa_{(n)}n_b\;.$

Moreover, in the language of Newman–Penrose formalism with the convention $\{(-,+,+,+); l^a n_a=-1\,,m^a \bar{m}_a=1\}$, we have

$(A.7)\quad \theta_{(l)}=-(\rho+\bar\rho)=-2\text{Re}(\rho)\,,\quad \theta_{(n)}=\mu+\bar\mu=2\text{Re}(\mu)\,,$

As we can see, for a geodesic null congruence, the optical scalar $\theta$ plays the same role with the expansion rates $\theta_{(\ell)}$ and $\theta_{(n)}$. Hence, for a geodesic null congruence, $\theta$ will be equal to either $\theta_{(\ell)}$ or $\theta_{(n)}$.

The shear of a geodesic null congruence is defined by

$(11)\quad {\hat\sigma} ^2=\hat\sigma_{ab}\hat{\bar\sigma}^{ab} =\frac{1}{2}\,g^{ca}\,g^{db}\,k_{(a\,;\,b)}\,k_{c\,;\,d} - \Big(\frac{1}{2}\, k^a{}_{;\,a} \Big)^2 = \,g^{ca}\,g^{db}\frac{1}{2}\,k_{(a\,;\,b)}\,k_{c\,;\,d} - {\hat\theta}^2\;.$

The twist of a geodesic null congruence is defined by

$(12)\quad {\hat\omega}^2 =\frac{1}{2}\,k_{[a\,;\,b]}\,k^{a\,;\,b} =g^{ca}\,g^{db}\,k_{[a\,;\,b]}\,k_{c\,;\,d}\;.$

In practice, a geodesic null congruence is usually defined by either its outgoing ($k^a=l^a$) or ingoing ($k^a=n^a$) tangent vector field (which are also its null normals). Thus, we obtain two sets of optical scalars $\{ \hat\theta_{(\ell)}\,,\hat\sigma_{(\ell)}\,, \hat\omega_{(\ell)} \}$ and $\{ \hat\theta_{(n)}\,,\hat\sigma_{(n)}\,, \hat\omega_{(n)} \}$, which are defined with respect to $l^a$ and $n^a$, respectively.

== Applications in decomposing the propagation equations ==
=== For a geodesic timelike congruence ===
The propagation (or evolution) of $B_{ab}$ for a geodesic timelike congruence along $Z^c$ respects the following equation,

$(13)\quad Z^c\nabla_c B_{ab}=-B^c_{\;\;b}B_{ac}+R_{cbad} Z^c Z^d\;.$

Take the trace of Eq(13) by contracting it with $g^{ab}$, and Eq(13) becomes

$(14)\quad Z^c\nabla_c \theta=\theta_{,\,\tau}=-\frac{1}{3}\theta^2 -\sigma_{ab}\sigma^{ab}+\omega_{ab}\omega^{ab}-R_{ab}Z^a Z^b$

in terms of the quantities in Eq(6). Moreover, the trace-free, symmetric part of Eq(13) is

$(15)\quad Z^c\nabla_c \sigma_{ab}=-\frac{2}{3}\theta\sigma_{ab}-\sigma_{ac}\sigma^c_{\;b}-\omega_{ac}\omega^c_{\;b}+\frac{1}{3}h_{ab}\,(\sigma_{cd}\sigma^{cd}-\omega_{cd}\omega^{cd})+C_{cbad}Z^c Z^d+\frac{1}{2}\tilde{R}_{ab}\,.$

Finally, the antisymmetric component of Eq(13) yields

$(16)\quad Z^c\nabla_c \omega_{ab}=-\frac{2}{3}\theta\omega_{ab}-2\sigma^c_{\;[b}\omega_{a]c}\;.$

=== For a geodesic null congruence ===
A (generic) geodesic null congruence obeys the following propagation equation,

$(16)\quad k^c\nabla_c \hat B_{ab}=-\hat B^c_{\;\;b}\hat B_{ac}+\widehat{R_{cbad} k^c k^d}\;.$

With the definitions summarized in Eq(9), Eq(14) could be rewritten into the following componential equations,

$(17)\quad k^c\nabla_c \hat\theta=\hat\theta_{,\,\lambda}=-\frac{1}{2}\hat\theta^2 -\hat\sigma_{ab}\hat\sigma^{ab}+\hat\omega_{ab}\hat\omega^{ab}-\widehat{R_{cd}k^c k^d}\;,$

$(18)\quad k^c\nabla_c \hat\sigma_{ab}=-\hat\theta\hat\sigma_{ab}+\widehat{C_{cbad}k^c k^d}\;,$

$(19)\quad k^c\nabla_c \hat\omega_{ab}=-\hat\theta\hat\omega_{ab}\;.$

=== For a restricted geodesic null congruence ===
For a geodesic null congruence restricted on a null hypersurface, we have

$(20)\quad k^c\nabla_c \theta=\hat\theta_{,\,\lambda}=-\frac{1}{2}\hat\theta^2 -\hat\sigma_{ab}\hat\sigma^{ab}-\widehat{R_{cd}k^c k^d}+\kappa_{(\ell)}\hat\theta\;,$

$(21)\quad k^c\nabla_c \hat\sigma_{ab}=-\hat\theta\hat\sigma_{ab}+\widehat{C_{cbad}k^c k^d}+\kappa_{(\ell)}\hat\sigma_{ab}\;,$

$(22)\quad k^c\nabla_c \hat\omega_{ab}=0\;.$

== Spin coefficients, Raychaudhuri's equation and optical scalars ==
For a better understanding of the previous section, we will briefly review the meanings of relevant NP spin coefficients in depicting null congruences. The tensor form of Raychaudhuri's equation governing null flows reads

$(23)\quad \mathcal{L}_{\ell}\theta_{(\ell)}=-\frac{1}{2}\theta_{(\ell)}^2+\tilde{\kappa}_{(\ell)}\theta_{(\ell)}-\sigma_{ab}\sigma^{ab}+\tilde{\omega}_{ab}\tilde{\omega}^{ab}-R_{ab}l^a l^b\,,$

where $\tilde{\kappa}_{(\ell)}$ is defined such that $\tilde{\kappa}_{(\ell)}l^b:= l^a \nabla_a l^b$. The quantities in Raychaudhuri's equation are related with the spin coefficients via

$(24)\quad \theta_{(\ell)}=-(\rho+\bar\rho)=-2\text{Re}(\rho)\,,\quad \theta_{(n)}=\mu+\bar\mu=2\text{Re}(\mu)\,,$

$(25)\quad \sigma_{ab}=-\sigma \bar m_a \bar m_b-\bar\sigma m_a m_b\,,$

$(26)\quad \tilde{\omega}_{ab}=\frac{1}{2}\,\Big(\rho-\bar\rho \Big)\,\Big(m_a \bar m_b-\bar m_a m_b \Big)=\text{Im}(\rho)\cdot\Big(m_a \bar m_b-\bar m_a m_b \Big)\,,$

where Eq(24) follows directly from $\hat{h}^{ab}=\hat{h}^{ba}=m^b\bar m^a+\bar m^b m^a$ and

$(27)\quad \theta_{(\ell)}=\hat{h}^{ba}\nabla_a l_b=m^b\bar m^a\nabla_a l_b+\bar m^b m^a\nabla_a l_b =m^b\bar \delta l_b+\bar m^b \delta l_b=-(\rho+\bar\rho)\,,$

$(28)\quad \theta_{(n)}=\hat{h}^{ba}\nabla_a n_b=\bar m^b m^a\nabla_a n_b+m^b\bar m^a\nabla_a n_b=\bar m^b \delta n_b+m^b\bar \delta n_b=\mu+\bar\mu\,.$

== See also ==
- Raychaudhari equation
- Congruence (general relativity)
