= Schreinemaker's analysis =

Schreinemaker's analysis is the use of Schreinemaker's rules to create a phase diagram.

After applying Schreinemaker's rules and creating a phase diagram, the resulting geometric figure will be thermodynamically accurate, although the axes will be undetermined. In order to determine the correct orientation of the geometric figure obtained through Schreinemaker's rules, one must have additional information about the given reactions or go through an analytical treatment of the thermodynamics of the relevant phases.

== Metastable extensions ==
Univariant lines are sometimes called reaction lines. The extension of a univariant line through the invariant point is called the metastable extension. Univariant lines are usually drawn as a solid line while their metastable extensions are drawn as a dotted line.

Univariant lines and their metastable extensions are often labeled by putting in square brackets the phase that is absent from the reaction associated with the given univariant line. In other words, since every univariant line represents a chemical equilibrium, these equilibrium curves are named with the phase (or phases) that is not involved in the equilibrium.

Take an example with four phases: A, B, C, D. If a univariant line is defined by the equilibrium reaction A+D←→C, this univariant line would be labeled [B], because the phase B is absent from the reaction A+D←→C.

== Morey–Schreinemaker coincidence theorem ==
The Morey–Schreinemaker coincidence theorem states that for every univariant line that passes through the invariant point, one side is stable and the other is metastable. The invariant point marks the boundary of the stable and metastable segments of a reaction line.

=== Phase rule ===
An invariant point is defined as a representation of an invariant system (0 degrees of freedom by Gibbs' phase rule) by a point on a phase diagram. A univariant line thus represents a univariant system with 1 degree of freedom. Two univariant lines can then define a divariant area with 2 degrees of freedom.

=== Metastable extensions rule ===
From the Morey–Schreinemaker coincidence theorem, Schreinemaker's rules can be determined. These rules can be used in the creation of an accurate phase diagram where both axes are intensive thermodynamic variables.

There are many correct collections of "Schreinemaker's rules" and the choice to use a given set of rules depends on the nature of the phase diagrams being created. Due to the phrasing of the Morey–Schreinemaker coincidence theorem, only one rule is essential to the Schreinemaker's rules. This is the so-called metastable extensions rule:

The metastable extension of the [phase-absent] reaction must fall in the sector in which that phase is stable in all possible assemblages.

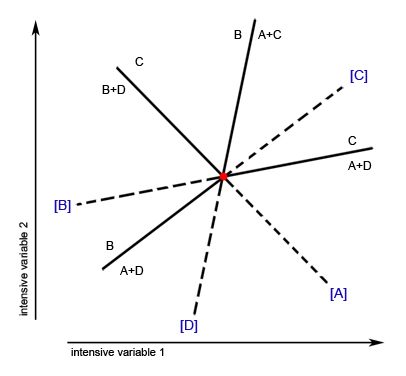
A generic phase diagram with unspecified axes; the invariant point is marked in red, metastable extensions labeled in blue, relevant reactions noted on stable ends of univariant lines.

This rule is geometrically sound in the construction of phase diagrams since for every metastable reaction, there must be a phase that is relatively stable. This phase must be the one which does not participate in the reaction and is therefore not consumed as a reactant or formed as a product, thus being "stable".

Some collections of Schreinemaker's rules will contain the following, additional, basic statements:

- No assemblage has a stability area greater than 180°.
- All reactants and products are stable in the field where the reaction plots.
- The absent phase is unstable where the reaction plots.
- Complex reactions (high number of participating phases) usually lie within bounding, simple reactions defining the phase stability region.
- The simplest divariant region usually contains the most metastable extensions.
- If each stable and metastable reaction curve is labeled with the absent phase, then the order of the named curves as one proceeds around the invariant point should cycle through all phases twice in order of their relative reaction components.

==== Assemblages ====
An assemblage is the phases on one side of an equilibrium reaction. An assemblage can be either a single phase or a collection of phases. In the example above with the equilibrium reaction A+D←→C, (A+D) is an assemblage as well as (C) on its own.
