= Narayan Chandra Rana =

Indian professor

Narayan Chandra Rana (12 October 1954 - 22 August 1996) was an Indian professor, writer, and former chairman of the Confederation of Indian Amateur Astronomers (CIAA).

== Early life ==
Rana was born on 12 October 1954 in Sauri, a village in southern Midnapore, West Bengal, to parents Rajendra Prasad and Nakfuri Devi. He was a student at the local school, Sauri Bholanath Vidyamandir. At school, Manindra Narayan Lahiri, a graduate from Calcutta and avid sky watcher, who introduced Rana to astronomy. Manindra Narayan's observation sessions would have Rana as his assistant well past midnight.

Rana attended the Presidency College, where he met the cosmologist Professor Amal Kumar Raychaudhuri.

Rana joined the TIFR, Bombay, in 1977, where he began his research in astrophysics with Professor Jayant Vishnu Narlikar. His thesis was entitled "An investigation of the properties of intergalactic dust". Rana was awarded the INSA Young Scientist Award in 1983 and the Year's Best Thesis award in the School of Physics, TIFR.

In spite of non-cooperative health and recurrent problems with his pacemaker, Rana has left his mark in many branches of astrophysics and in amateur astronomy in India. He was the chairman of the CIAA. His project of measuring the diameter of the Sun during the total solar eclipse on 24 October 1995, involving a large team of young students, was a very challenging one.

Professor Narayan Chandra Rana died on 22 August 1996 in Pune, at the age of 42.

== Education ==
- Primary, Sauri Primary School
- Higher Secondary, Sauri Bholanath Vidyamandir High School
- Graduate in Physics, Presidency College, Calcutta
- Post Graduation in Physics, Rajabazar Science College, Calcutta University
- PhD from TATA Institute of Fundamental Research (TIFR)
- Post Doctorate, Durham University, U.K.

== Achievements ==
- Secured first position in all subjects throughout his school life.
- Passed Higher Secondary in 1970 with Letter Marks.
- Became Second in M.Sc. with Physics.
- Got Geeta Udgonkar Medal for best research from TIFR, Bombay.
- Received International award “Wealth Bursnay Award” & “SERC for Fellowship” for research on “Evolution of Galaxy and Earth” from Durham University.
- Best Teacher Award from Pune,1995.
- Best Young Scientist Award from Indian National Science Academy (INSA).
- Posthumous Award of Rs. One lakh and a certificate from The National Council for Science Academy & Technology Communication.

== Brief works ==
He was a researcher at TIFR, Bombay, till 1991, after which he worked as a research professor at IUCAA, Pune. He worked as a director and member in many fields of astrophysics of national and international reputation.

== Notable works ==
1. Classical Mechanics – Included in M.Sc. syllabus and Oxford University.
2. Our Solar System – (Readable for all)
3. Night Fall on a Sunny Morning.
4. Myth and Legends Related to Eclipses' (1995)
5. Observer’s Planner (1997)
6. Challenge of Astronomy (1995)

In addition, he wrote about 70 research papers, many essays and lectures, and unfinished books and writings.
