= Incongruent melting =

When a solid substance does not melt uniformly

Incongruent melting occurs when a solid substance being partially melted does not melt uniformly, so that the chemical composition of neither the resulting liquid nor the resulting solid is the same as that of the original solid. For example, melting of orthoclase (KAlSi_{3}O_{8}) produces leucite (KAlSi_{2}O_{6}) in addition to a melt. The melt produced is richer in silica (SiO_{2}). The proportions of leucite and melt formed can be recombined to yield the bulk composition of the starting feldspar. Another mineral that can melt incongruently is enstatite (Mg_{2}Si_{2}O_{6}), which produces forsterite (Mg_{2}SiO_{4}) in addition to a melt richer in SiO_{2} when melting at low pressure. Enstatite melts congruently at higher pressures between 2.5 and 5.5 kilobars.

== See also ==
- Congruent melting
- Incongruent transition
- Phase diagram
