= Congruent melting =

When the composition of the liquid formed during melting is the same as that of the solid

Congruent melting occurs during melting of a compound when the composition of the liquid that forms is the same as the composition of the solid. It can be contrasted with incongruent melting. This generally happens in two-component systems. To take a general case, let A and B be the two components and AB a stable solid compound formed by their chemical combination. If we draw a phase diagram for the system, we notice that there are three solid phases, namely A, B and compound AB. Accordingly, there will be three fusion or freezing point curves AC, BE and CDE for the three solid phases. In the phase diagram, we can notice that the top point D of the phase diagram is the congruent melting point of the compound AB because the solid and liquid phases now have the same composition. Evidently, at this temperature, the two-component system has become a one-component system because both solid and liquid phases contains only the compound AB.

Congruent melting point represents a definite temperature just like the melting points of pure components. In some phase diagrams, the congruent melting point of a compound AB may lie above the melting points of pure components A and B. But it is not always necessarily the case. There are different types of systems known in which the congruent melting point is observed below the melting points of the pure components. This happens for inter-metallic compounds, for example, for MgSi_{2}.

== See also ==
- Congruent transition
- Incongruent melting
- Phase diagram
- Phase rule
