= Computational thermodynamics =

Branch of thermodynamics

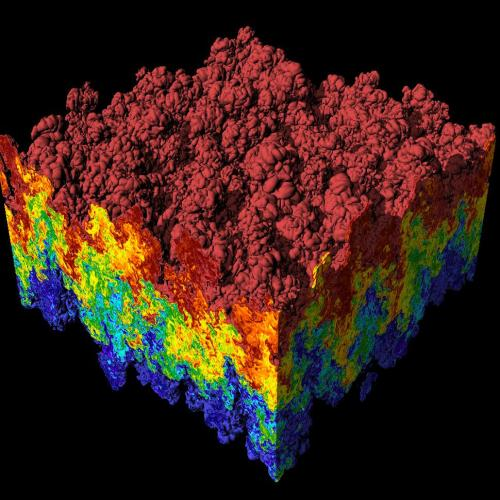
Scientific visualization of an extremely large simulation of a Rayleigh–Taylor instability problem.

Computational thermodynamics is the use of computers to simulate thermodynamic problems specific to materials science, particularly used in the construction of phase diagrams.

Several open and commercial programs exist to perform these operations. The concept of the technique is minimization of Gibbs free energy of the system; the success of this method is due not only to properly measuring thermodynamic properties, such as those in the list of thermodynamic properties, but also due to the extrapolation of the properties of metastable allotropes of the chemical elements.

== History ==
The computational modeling of metal-based phase diagrams, which dates back to the beginning of the previous century mainly by Johannes van Laar and to the modeling of regular solutions, has evolved in more recent years to the CALPHAD (CALculation of PHAse Diagrams). This has been pioneered by American metallurgist Larry Kaufman since the 1970s.

== Current state ==
Computational thermodynamics may be considered a part of materials informatics and is a cornerstone of the concepts behind the materials genome project. While crystallographic databases are used mainly as a reference source, thermodynamic databases represent one of the earliest examples of informatics, as these databases were integrated into thermochemical computations to map phase stability in binary and ternary alloys. Many concepts and software used in computational thermodynamics are credited to the SGTE Group, a consortium devoted to the development of thermodynamic databases; the open elements database is freely available based on the paper by Dinsdale. This so-called "unary" system proves to be a common basis for the development of binary and multiple systems and is used by both commercial and open software in this field.

However, as stated in recent CALPHAD papers and meetings, such a Dinsdale/SGTE database will likely need to be corrected over time despite the utility in keeping a common base. In this case, most published assessments will likely have to be revised, similarly to rebuilding a house due to a severely broken foundation. This concept has also been depicted as an "inverted pyramid." Merely extending the current approach (limited to temperatures above room temperature) is a complex task. PyCalphad, a Python library, was designed to facilitate simple computational thermodynamics calculation using open source code. In complex systems, computational methods such as CALPHAD are employed to model thermodynamic properties for each phase and simulate multicomponent phase behavior. The application of CALPHAD to high pressures in some important applications, which are not restricted to one side of materials science like the Fe-C system, confirms experimental results by using computational thermodynamic calculations of phase relations in the Fe–C system at high pressures. Other scientists even considered viscosity and other physical parameters, which are beyond the domain of thermodynamics.

== Future developments ==
There is still a gap between ab initio methods and operative computational thermodynamics databases. In the past, a simplified approach introduced by the early works of Larry Kaufman, based on Miedema's Model, was employed to check the correctness of even the simplest binary systems. However, relating the two communities to Solid State Physics and Materials Science remains a challenge, as it has been for many years. Promising results from ab initio quantum mechanics molecular simulation packages like VASP are readily integrated in thermodynamic databases with approaches like Zentool.

A relatively easy way to collect data for intermetallic compounds is now possible by using Open Quantum Materials Database. A series of papers focused on the concept of Zentropy has been proposed by prof. Z.K. Liu and his research group has been recently proposed.

== See also ==
- Phase diagram
- Gibbs energy
- Enthalpy of mixing
- Miedema's Model
- Materials Genome
- UNIQUAC
- UNIFAC

== University Courses on Computational Thermodynamics ==
- Computational Thermodynamics for Materials Design KTH, Sweden
- MatSE580: Computational Thermodynamics of Materials, Pennsylvania State University, USA
- Computational Thermodynamics University of Brno, Czech Republic
