= Congruence (manifolds) =

In the theory of smooth manifolds, a congruence is the set of integral curves defined by a nonvanishing vector field defined on the manifold. Congruences are an important concept in general relativity, and are also important in parts of Riemannian geometry.

== A motivational example ==
The idea of a congruence is probably better explained by giving an example than by a definition. Consider the smooth manifold R². Vector fields can be specified as first order linear partial differential operators, such as

$$\vec{X} = ( x^2 - y^2 ) \, \partial_x + 2 \, x y \, \partial_y$$

These correspond to a system of first order linear ordinary differential equations, in this case

$$\dot{x} = x^2 - y^2,\; \dot{y} = 2 \, x y$$

where dot denotes a derivative with respect to some (dummy) parameter. The solutions of such systems are families of parameterized curves, in this case

$$x(\lambda) = \frac{x_0 - (x_0^2+y_0^2) \, \lambda}{1 - 2 \, x_0 \, \lambda + (x_0^2 + y_0^2) \, \lambda^2}$$
$$y(\lambda) = \frac{y_0}{1 - 2 \, x_0 \, \lambda + (x_0^2 + y_0^2) \, \lambda^2}$$

This family is what is often called a congruence of curves, or just congruence for short. This particular example happens to have two singularities, where the vector field vanishes. These are fixed points of the flow. (A flow is a one-dimensional group of diffeomorphisms; a flow defines an action by the one-dimensional Lie group R, having locally nice geometric properties.) These two singularities correspond to two points, rather than two curves. In this example, the other integral curves are all simple closed curves. Many flows are considerably more complicated than this. To avoid complications arising from the presence of singularities, usually one requires the vector field to be nonvanishing. If we add more mathematical structure, our congruence may acquire new significance.

== Congruences in Riemannian manifolds ==
For example, if we make our smooth manifold into a Riemannian manifold by adding a Riemannian metric tensor, say the one defined by the line element

$$ds^2 = \left( \frac{2}{1 + x^2 + y^2} \right)^2 \, \left( dx^2 + dy^2 \right)$$

our congruence might become a geodesic congruence. Indeed, in the example from the preceding section, our curves become geodesics on an ordinary round sphere (with the North pole excised). If we had added the standard Euclidean metric $ds^2 = dx^2 + dy^2$ instead, our curves would have become circles, but not geodesics.

An interesting example of a Riemannian geodesic congruence, related to our first example, is the Clifford congruence on P³, which is also known at the Hopf bundle or Hopf fibration. The integral curves or fibers respectively are certain pairwise linked great circles, the orbits in the space of unit norm quaternions under left multiplication by a given unit quaternion of unit norm.

== Congruences in Lorentzian manifolds ==
In a Lorentzian manifold, such as a spacetime model in general relativity (which will usually be an exact or approximate solution to the Einstein field equation), congruences are called timelike, null, or spacelike if the tangent vectors are everywhere timelike, null, or spacelike respectively. A congruence is called a geodesic congruence if the tangent vector field $\vec{X}$ has vanishing covariant derivative, $\nabla_{\vec{X}} \vec{X} = 0$.

== See also ==
- Congruence (general relativity)
