= Incongruent transition =

Transition between 2 phases involving a change in chemical composition

Incongruent transition, in chemistry, is a mass transition between two phases which involves a change in chemical composition. This is contrasted with congruent transition, for which the composition remains the same.

The transition may be that of melting, vaporization or allotropism. The concept is also often extended to related phenomena, for example, incongruent dissolution of a solid by a liquid solvent, which is often encountered in geology.

The term "phase decomposition" is sometimes used to describe incongruent transition. However, it has to be kept in mind that incongruent transition is described by an equilibrium.

For an example, see incongruent melting.
