= Gas constant =

Physical constant equivalent to the Boltzmann constant, but in different units

Value of R	Unit
SI units
8.31446261815324	J⋅K^{−1}⋅mol^{−1}
8.31446261815324	m^{3}⋅Pa⋅K^{−1}⋅mol^{−1}
8.31446261815324	kg⋅m^{2}⋅s^{−2}⋅K^{−1}⋅mol^{−1}
Other common units
8314.46261815324	L⋅Pa⋅K^{−1}⋅mol^{−1}
8.31446261815324	L⋅kPa⋅K^{−1}⋅mol^{−1}
0.0831446261815324	L⋅bar⋅K^{−1}⋅mol^{−1}
8.31446261815324×10^{7}	erg⋅K^{−1}⋅mol^{−1}
0.730240507295273	atm⋅ft^{3}⋅lbmol^{−1}⋅°R^{−1}
10.731577089016	psi⋅ft^{3}⋅lbmol^{−1}⋅°R^{−1}
1.985875279009	BTU⋅lbmol^{−1}⋅°R^{−1}
297.031214	inH_{2}O⋅ft^{3}⋅lbmol^{−1}⋅°R^{−1}
554.984319180	torr⋅ft^{3}⋅lbmol^{−1}⋅°R^{−1}
0.082057366080960	L⋅atm⋅K^{−1}⋅mol^{−1}
62.363598221529	L⋅torr⋅K^{−1}⋅mol^{−1}
1.98720425864083...	cal⋅K^{−1}⋅mol^{−1}
8.20573660809596...×10^{−5}	m^{3}⋅atm⋅K^{−1}⋅mol^{−1}

Heating gas at constant pressure and constant-volume

The molar gas constant (also known as the gas constant, universal gas constant, or ideal gas constant) is denoted by the symbol R or R̅. It is the molar equivalent to the Boltzmann constant, expressed in units of energy per temperature increment per amount of substance, rather than energy per temperature increment per particle. The constant is also a combination of the constants from Boyle's law, Charles's law, Avogadro's law, and Gay-Lussac's law. It is a physical constant that is featured in many fundamental equations in the physical sciences, such as the ideal gas law, the Arrhenius equation, and the Nernst equation.

The gas constant is the constant of proportionality that relates the energy scale in physics to the temperature scale and the scale used for amount of substance. Thus, the value of the gas constant ultimately derives from historical decisions and accidents in the setting of units of energy, temperature and amount of substance. The Boltzmann constant and the Avogadro constant were similarly determined, which separately relate energy to temperature and particle count to amount of substance.

The gas constant R is defined as the Avogadro constant N_{A} multiplied by the Boltzmann constant k (or k_{B}):
$$\begin{align}
R &= N_\text{A} k \\
&= 6.02214076 \cdot 10^{23} \text{mol}^{-1} \cdot 1.380649   \cdot 10^{-23} \text{J} \cdot \text{K}^{-1} \\
&= 8.31446261815324 \ \text{J} \cdot \text{K}^{-1} \cdot \text{mol}^{-1}
\end{align}$$

Since the 2019 revision of the SI, both N_{A} and k are defined with exact numerical values when expressed in SI units. As a consequence, the SI value of the molar gas constant is exact.

Some have suggested that it might be appropriate to name the symbol R the Regnault constant in honour of the French chemist Henri Victor Regnault, whose accurate experimental data were used to calculate the early value of the constant. However, the origin of the letter R to represent the constant is elusive. The universal gas constant was apparently introduced independently by August Friedrich Horstmann (1873) and Dmitri Mendeleev who reported it first on 12 September 1874. Using his extensive measurements of the properties of gases, Mendeleev also calculated it with high precision, within 0.3% of its modern value.

The gas constant occurs in the ideal gas law:
$$PV = nRT = m R_\text{specific} T,$$
where P is the absolute pressure, V is the volume of gas, n is the amount of substance, m is the mass, and T is the thermodynamic temperature. R_{specific} is the mass-specific gas constant. The gas constant is expressed in the same unit as molar heat.

== Dimensions ==
From the ideal gas law $PV = nRT$ we get
$$R = \frac{PV}{nT},$$
where P is pressure, V is volume, n is the amount of a given substance, and T is temperature.

As pressure is defined as force per area, the gas equation can also be written as
$$R = \frac{ \dfrac{\text{force}}{\text{area}} \times \text{volume} }
{ \text{amount} \times \text{temperature} }.$$

Area and volume are (length)^{2} and (length)^{3} respectively. Therefore:
$$\begin{align}
R &= \frac{ \dfrac{\text{force} }{ (\text{length})^2} \times (\text{length})^3 } { \text{amount} \times \text{temperature} } \\ \\
&= \frac{ \text{force} \times \text{length} } { \text{amount} \times \text{temperature} }.
\end{align}$$

Since force × length = work,
$$R = \frac{ \text{work} }{ \text{amount} \times \text{temperature} }.$$

The physical significance of R is work per mole per kelvin. It may be expressed in any set of units representing work or energy (such as joules), units representing temperature on an absolute scale (such as kelvin or rankine), and any system of units designating a mole or a similar pure number that allows an equation of macroscopic mass and fundamental particle numbers in a system, such as an ideal gas (see Avogadro constant).

Instead of a mole, the constant can be expressed by considering the normal cubic metre.

Otherwise, it is also true that
$$\text{force} = \frac{ \text{mass} \times \text{length} } { (\text{time})^2 }.$$

Therefore, R can be written as
$$R = \frac{ \text{mass} \times \text{length}^2 } { \text{amount} \times \text{temperature} \times (\text{time})^2 }.$$

So, in terms of SI base units, R = 8.31446261815324 kg⋅m^{2}⋅s^{−2}⋅K^{−1}⋅mol^{−1}.

== Relationship with the Boltzmann constant ==
The Boltzmann constant k_{B} (alternatively k) may be used in place of the molar gas constant by working in pure particle count, N, rather than amount of substance, n, since
$$R = N_\text{A} k_\text{B},$$
where N_{A} is the Avogadro constant. For example, the ideal gas law in terms of the Boltzmann constant is
$$PV = N k_\text{B} T,$$
where N is the number of particles (molecules in this case), or to generalize to an inhomogeneous system the local form holds:
$$P = n k_\text{B} T,$$
where n = N/V is the number density. Finally, by defining the kinetic energy associated to the temperature,
$$T := k_\text{B} T,$$
the equation becomes simply
$$P = n T,$$
which is the form usually encountered in statistical mechanics and other branches of theoretical physics.

== Measurement and replacement with defined value ==
As of 2006, the most precise measurement of R had been obtained by measuring the speed of sound c_{a}(P, T) in argon at the temperature T of the triple point of water at different pressures P, and extrapolating to the zero-pressure limit c_{a}(0, T). The value of R is then obtained from the relation
$$c_\text{a}(0, T) = \sqrt{\frac{\gamma_0 R T}{A_\text{r}(\text{Ar}) M_\text{u}}},$$
where

- γ_{0} is the heat capacity ratio (5/3 for monatomic gases such as argon);
- T is the temperature, T_{TPW} = 273.16 K by the definition of the kelvin at that time;
- A_{r}(Ar) is the relative atomic mass of argon; and
- M_{u} = 10^{−3} kg⋅mol^{−1} as defined at the time.

However, following the 2019 revision of the SI, R now has an exact value defined in terms of other exactly defined physical constants.

== Specific gas constant ==
R_{specific} for dry air	Unit
287.052874	J⋅kg^{−1}⋅K^{−1}
53.3523	ft⋅lbf⋅lb^{−1}⋅°R^{−1}
1,716.46	ft⋅lbf⋅slug^{−1}⋅°R^{−1}

The specific gas constant of a gas or a mixture of gases (R_{specific}) is given by the molar gas constant divided by the molar mass (M) of the gas or mixture:
$$R_\text{specific} = \frac{R}{M}.$$

Just as the molar gas constant can be related to the Boltzmann constant, so can the specific gas constant by dividing the Boltzmann constant by the molecular mass of the gas:
$$R_\text{specific} = \frac{k_\text{B}}{m}.$$

Another important relationship comes from thermodynamics. Mayer's relation relates the specific gas constant to the specific heat capacities for a calorically or thermally perfect gas:
$$R_\text{specific} = c_P - c_V,$$
where c_{P} is the specific heat capacity for a constant pressure and c_{V} is the specific heat capacity for a constant volume.

It is common, especially in engineering applications, to represent the specific gas constant by the symbol R. In such cases, the universal gas constant is usually given a different symbol such as R̅ to distinguish it. In any case, the context and/or unit of the gas constant should make it clear as to whether the universal or specific gas constant is being referred to.

In case of air, using the perfect gas law and the standard sea-level conditions (SSL) (air density ρ_{0} = 1.225 kg/m^{3}, temperature T_{0} = 288.15 K and pressure p_{0} = 101325 Pa), we have that R_{air} = P_{0}/(ρ_{0}T_{0}) = 287.052874247 J·kg^{−1}·K^{−1}. Then the molar mass of air is computed by M_{0} = R/R_{air} = 28.964917 g/mol.

== U.S. Standard Atmosphere ==
The U.S. Standard Atmosphere, 1976 (USSA1976) defines the gas constant R^{∗} as R^{∗} = 8.31432×10^{3} N⋅m⋅kmol^{−1}⋅K^{−1}, equivalent to 8.31432 J⋅K^{−1}⋅mol^{−1}.

The use of the kilomole in the unit results in an extra factor of 1000 in the constant. The USSA1976 acknowledges that their defined value of R^{*} is not consistent with the cited values for the Avogadro constant and the Boltzmann constant. This disparity is not a significant departure from accuracy – R^{∗} is slightly greater than 99.998% of the actual value of the constant, R = 8.31446261815324 J⋅mol^{−1}⋅K^{−1} – and USSA1976 uses this value of R^{∗} for all the calculations of the standard atmosphere. When using the ISO value of R, the calculated pressure increases by only 0.62 pascal at 11 kilometres (the equivalent of a difference of only 17.4 centimetres or 6.8 inches) and 0.292 Pa at 20 km (the equivalent of a difference of only 33.8 cm or 13.2 in).

This definition was published well before the 2019 SI revision, through which the constant was given an exact value.
