= August Friedrich Horstmann =

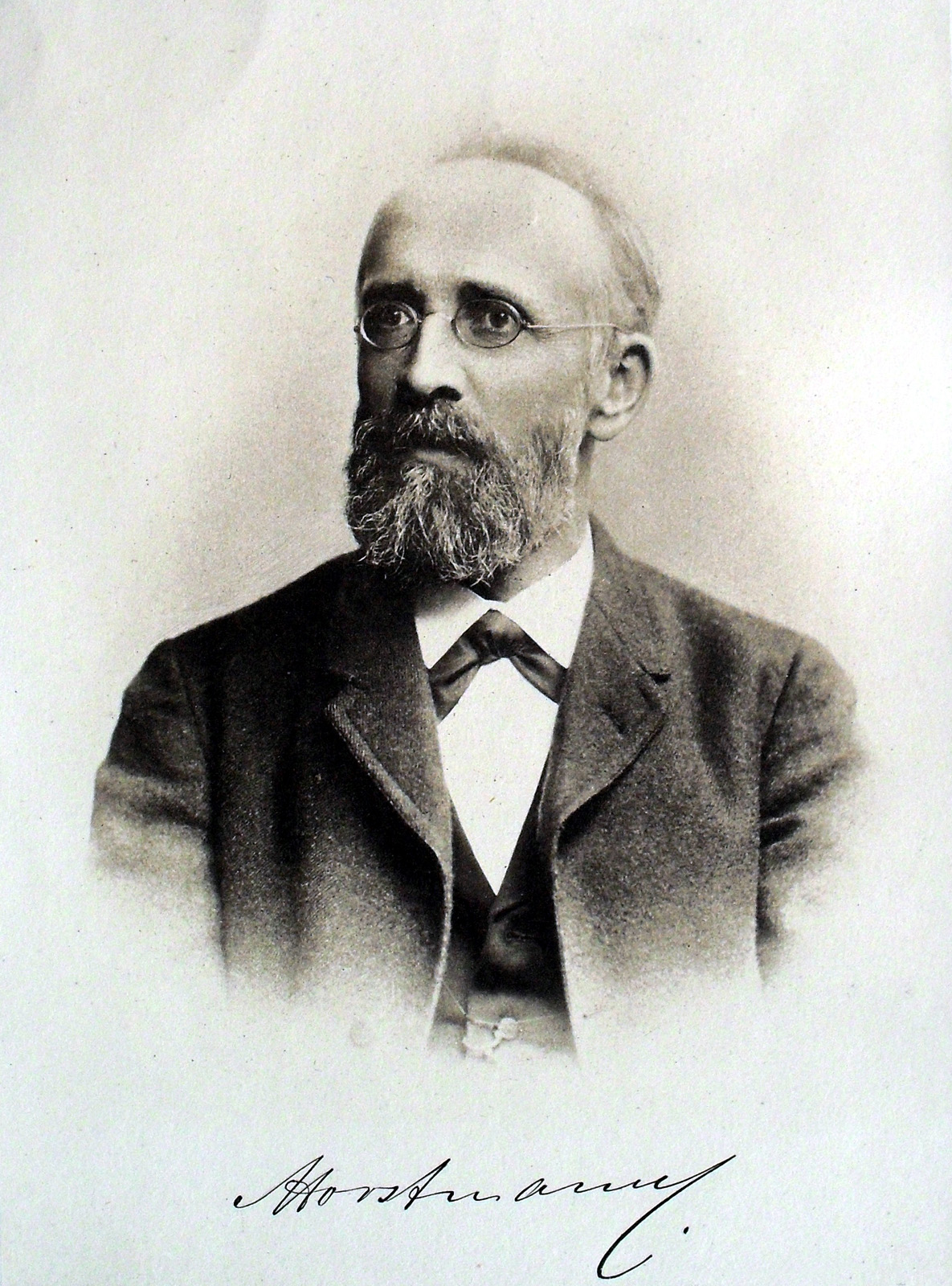

August Friedrich Horstmann (20 November 1842 – 8 October 1929) was a German physical chemist who contributed to a thermodynamic understanding of chemical reactions and equilibria. His mathematical approach published in 1873 was largely overshadowed by the independent and identical findings of Josiah Willard Gibbs made about three years later.

Horstmann was born in Mannheim where his parents Georg Friedrich and Charlotte Friederike née Köhler ran a grocery business. He went to the Lycaeum and dropped out of high school due to short-sight and worked with his father. After three years he decided to study again and went to Heidelberg in 1862 where he attended chemistry classes under Emil Erlenmeyer. In 1865, he received a doctorate and went to study in Zurich under Johannes Wislicenus and Rudolf Clausius followed in 1866 with studies at Bonn with Hans Heinrich Landolt. He examined molecular weight and specific gravity of liquids. He became an associate professor in 1870 but short sight was still a problem and few students joined him. His major work was on the application of the laws of thermodynamics to chemical equilibria.

Horstmann married Clothilde Henriette Gernandt (1844–1921) in 1873 and they had five children. He went blind in 1902.
