= Boyle's law =

Relation between gas pressure and volume

An animation showing the relationship between pressure and volume when mass and temperature are held constant

Boyle's law, also referred to the Boyle–Mariotte law or Mariotte's law (especially in France), is an empirical gas law that describes the relationship between pressure and volume of a confined gas. Boyle's law has been stated as:

The absolute pressure exerted by a given mass of an ideal gas is inversely proportional to the volume it occupies if the temperature and amount of gas remain unchanged within a closed system.

Mathematically, Boyle's law can be stated as:

$P \propto \frac{1}{V}$	Pressure is inversely proportional to the volume

or

PV = k	The product of pressure and volume is a constant number (here denoted as k)

where P is the pressure of the gas, V is the volume of the gas, and k is a constant for a particular temperature and amount of gas.

Boyle's law states that when the temperature of a given mass of confined gas is constant, the product of its pressure and volume is also constant. When comparing the same substance under two different sets of conditions, the law can be expressed as:
$$P_1 V_1 = P_2 V_2.$$
showing that as volume increases, the pressure of a gas decreases proportionally, and vice versa.

Boyle's law is named after Robert Boyle, who published the original law in 1662. An equivalent law is Mariotte’s law, named after French physicist Edme Mariotte.

== History ==
Graph of Boyle's original data showing the hyperbolic curve of the relationship between pressure (P) and volume (V) of the form P = k/V

The relationship between pressure and volume was first noted by Richard Towneley and Henry Power in the 17th century. Robert Boyle confirmed their discovery through experiments and published the results. According to Robert Gunther and other authorities, it was Boyle's assistant, Robert Hooke, who built the experimental apparatus. Boyle's law is based on experiments with air, which he considered to be a fluid of particles at rest in between small invisible springs. Boyle may have begun experimenting with gases due to an interest in air as an essential element of life; for example, he published works on the growth of plants without air. Boyle used a closed J-shaped tube and after pouring mercury from one side he forced the air on the other side to contract under the pressure of mercury. After repeating the experiment several times and using different amounts of mercury he found that under controlled conditions, the pressure of a gas is inversely proportional to the volume occupied by it.

The French physicist Edme Mariotte (1620–1684) discovered the same law independently of Boyle in 1679, after Boyle had published it in 1662. Mariotte did, however, discover that air volume changes with temperature. Thus this law is sometimes referred to as Mariotte's law or the Boyle–Mariotte law. Later, in 1687 in the Philosophiæ Naturalis Principia Mathematica, Newton showed mathematically that in an elastic fluid consisting of particles at rest, between which are repulsive forces inversely proportional to their distance, the density would be directly proportional to the pressure, but this mathematical treatise does not involve any Mariott temperature dependence and is not the proper physical explanation for the observed relationship. Instead of a static theory, a kinetic theory is needed, which was developed over the next two centuries by Daniel Bernoulli (1738) and more fully by Rudolf Clausius (1857), Maxwell and Boltzmann.

This law was the first physical law to be expressed in the form of an equation describing the dependence of two variable quantities.

== Definition ==
Boyle's law demonstrations

The law itself can be stated as follows:

For a fixed mass of an ideal gas kept at a fixed temperature, pressure and volume are inversely proportional.

Boyle's law is a gas law, stating that the pressure and volume of a gas have an inverse relationship. If volume increases, then pressure decreases and vice versa, when the temperature is held constant.

Therefore, when the volume is halved, the pressure is doubled; and if the volume is doubled, the pressure is halved.

=== Relation with kinetic theory and ideal gases ===
As the pressure on a gas increases, the volume of the gas decreases because the gas particles are forced closer together.

Most gases behave like ideal gases at moderate pressures and temperatures. The technology of the 17th century could not produce very high pressures or very low temperatures. Hence, the law was not likely to have deviations at the time of publication. As improvements in technology permitted higher pressures and lower temperatures, deviations from the ideal gas behavior became noticeable, and the relationship between pressure and volume can only be accurately described employing real gas theory. The deviation is expressed as the compressibility factor.

Boyle (and Mariotte) derived the law solely by experiment. The law can also be derived theoretically based on the presumed existence of atoms and molecules and assumptions about motion and perfectly elastic collisions (see kinetic theory of gases). These assumptions were met with enormous resistance in the positivist scientific community at the time, however, as they were seen as purely theoretical constructs for which there was not the slightest observational evidence.

Daniel Bernoulli (in 1737–1738) derived Boyle's law by applying Newton's laws of motion at the molecular level. It remained ignored until around 1890, when John Waterston published a paper building the main precepts of kinetic theory; this was rejected by the Royal Society of England. Later works of James Prescott Joule, Rudolf Clausius and in particular Ludwig Boltzmann firmly established the kinetic theory of gases and brought attention to both the theories of Bernoulli and Waterston.

The debate between proponents of energetics and atomism led Boltzmann to write a book in 1898, which endured criticism until his suicide in 1906. Albert Einstein in 1905 showed how kinetic theory applies to the Brownian motion of a fluid-suspended particle, which was confirmed in 1908 by Jean Perrin.

=== Equation ===
Relationships between Boyle's, Charles's, Gay-Lussac's, Avogadro's, combined and ideal gas laws, with the Boltzmann constant k = R/N_{A} = (n R)/N (in each law, properties circled are variable and properties not circled are held constant)

The mathematical equation for Boyle's law is:
$$PV = k$$
where P denotes the pressure of the system, V denotes the volume of the gas, k is a constant value representative of the temperature of the system and amount of gas.

So long as temperature remains constant the same amount of energy given to the system persists throughout its operation and therefore, theoretically, the value of k will remain constant. However, due to the derivation of pressure as perpendicular applied force and the probabilistic likelihood of collisions with other particles through collision theory, the application of force to a surface may not be infinitely constant for such values of V, but will have a limit when differentiating such values over a given time. Forcing the volume V of the fixed quantity of gas to increase, keeping the gas at the initially measured temperature, the pressure P must decrease proportionally. Conversely, reducing the volume of the gas increases the pressure. Boyle's law is used to predict the result of introducing a change, in volume and pressure only, to the initial state of a fixed quantity of gas.

The initial and final volumes and pressures of the fixed amount of gas, where the initial and final temperatures are the same (heating or cooling will be required to meet this condition), are related by the equation:
$$P_1 V_1 = P_2 V_2.$$
Here P_{1} and V_{1} represent the original pressure and volume, respectively, and P_{2} and V_{2} represent the second pressure and volume.

Boyle's law, Charles's law, and Gay-Lussac's law form the combined gas law. The three gas laws in combination with Avogadro's law can be generalized by the ideal gas law.

== Human breathing system ==
Boyle's law is often used as part of an explanation on how the breathing system works in the human body. This commonly involves explaining how the lung volume may be increased or decreased and thereby cause a relatively lower or higher air pressure within them (in keeping with Boyle's law). This forms a pressure difference between the air inside the lungs and the environmental air pressure, which in turn precipitates either inhalation or exhalation as air moves from high to low pressure.

== See also ==
Related phenomena:

- Water thief
- Industrial Revolution
- Steam engine

Other gas laws:

- Dalton's law – Empirical law of partial pressures
- Charles's law – Relationship between volume and temperature of a gas at constant pressure
- Ideal gas law – Equation of the state of a hypothetical ideal gas
