= Gay-Lussac's law =

Relationship between pressure and temperature of a gas at constant volume

Gay-Lussac's law refers to two distinct principles in physical chemistry established by Joseph Louis Gay-Lussac: the law of combining volumes (describing gaseous chemical reactions) and the pressure–temperature law (for a gas at constant volume).

The latter law was published by Gay-Lussac in 1802, but in the article in which he described his work, he cited earlier unpublished work from the 1780s by Jacques Charles. Consequently, the volume-temperature proportionality is usually known as Charles's law.

== Law of combining volumes ==
Under STP, a reaction between three cubic meters of hydrogen gas and one cubic meter of nitrogen gas will produce about two cubic meters of ammonia.

The law of combining volumes states that when gases chemically react together, they do so in amounts by volume which bear small whole-number ratios (the volumes calculated at the same temperature and pressure).

The ratio between the volumes of the reactant gases and the gaseous products can be expressed in simple whole numbers.

For example, Gay-Lussac found that two volumes of hydrogen react with one volume of oxygen to form two volumes of gaseous water. Expressed concretely, 100 mL of hydrogen combine with 50 mL of oxygen to give 100 mL of water vapor: Hydrogen(100 mL) + Oxygen(50 mL) = Water(100 mL). Thus, the volumes of hydrogen and oxygen which combine (i.e., 100mL and 50mL) bear a simple ratio of 2:1, as also is the case for the ratio of product water vapor to reactant oxygen.

Based on Gay-Lussac's results, Amedeo Avogadro hypothesized in 1811 that, at the same temperature and pressure, equal volumes of gases (of whatever kind) contain equal numbers of molecules (Avogadro's law). He pointed out that if this hypothesis is true, then the previously stated result

2 volumes of hydrogen + 1 volume of oxygen = 2 volume of gaseous water

could also be expressed as

2 molecules of hydrogen + 1 molecule of oxygen = 2 molecules of water.

The law of combining volumes of gases was announced publicly by Joseph Louis Gay-Lussac on the last day of 1808, and published in 1809. Since there was no direct evidence for Avogadro's molecular theory, very few chemists adopted Avogadro's hypothesis as generally valid until the Italian chemist Stanislao Cannizzaro argued convincingly for it during the First International Chemical Congress in 1860.

== Pressure-temperature law ==
Visualisation of the law showing direct proportionality between pressure and temperature

In the 17th century Guillaume Amontons discovered a regular relationship between the pressure and temperature of a gas at constant volume. Some introductory physics textbooks still define the pressure-temperature relationship as Gay-Lussac's law. Gay-Lussac primarily investigated the relationship between volume and temperature and published it in 1802, but his work did cover some comparison between pressure and temperature. Given the relative technology available to both men, Amontons could only work with air as a gas, whereas Gay-Lussac was able to experiment with multiple types of common gases, such as oxygen, nitrogen, and hydrogen.

== Volume-temperature law ==
Regarding the volume-temperature relationship, Gay-Lussac attributed his findings to Jacques Charles because he used much of Charles's unpublished data from 1787 – hence, the law became known as Charles's law or the law of Charles and Gay-Lussac.

Amontons's, Charles', and Boyle's law form the combined gas law. These three gas laws in combination with Avogadro's law can be generalized by the ideal gas law.

Gay-Lussac used the formula acquired from ΔV/V = αΔT to define the rate of expansion α for gases. For air, he found a relative expansion ΔV/V = 37.50% and obtained a value of α = 37.50%/100 °C = 1/266.66 °C which indicated that the value of absolute zero was approximately 266.66 °C below 0 °C. The value of the rate of expansion α is approximately the same for all gases and this is also sometimes referred to as Gay-Lussac's law. See the introduction to this article, and Charles's law.

== See also ==
- Avogadro's law – Relationship between volume and amount of a gas at constant temperature and pressure
- Boyle's law – Relation between gas pressure and volume
- Charles's law – Relationship between volume and temperature of a gas at constant pressure
- Combined gas law – Combination of Charles', Boyle's and Gay-Lussac's gas laws
