= Charles's law =

Relationship between volume and temperature of a gas at constant pressure

An animation demonstrating the relationship between volume and temperature

Relationships between Boyle's, Charles's, Gay-Lussac's, Avogadro's, combined and ideal gas laws, with the Boltzmann constant k = R/N_{A} = (n R)/N (in each law, properties circled are variable and properties not circled are held constant)

Charles's law (also known as the law of volumes) is an experimental gas law that describes how gases tend to expand when heated. A modern statement of Charles's law is:

When the pressure on a sample of a dry gas is held constant, the Kelvin temperature and the volume will be in direct proportion.

This relationship of direct proportion can be written as:

$$V \propto T$$

So this means:

$$\frac{V}{T} = k,  \quad \text{or} \quad V=k T$$

where:

- V is the volume of the gas,
- T is the temperature of the gas (measured in kelvins), and
- k is a constant for a particular pressure and amount of gas.

This law describes how a gas expands as the temperature increases; Conversely, a decrease in temperature will lead to a decrease in volume. For comparing the same substance under two different sets of conditions, the law can be written as:

$\frac{V_1}{T_1}=\frac{V_2}{T_2}$

The equation shows that, as absolute temperature increases, the volume of the gas also increases in proportion.

== History ==
The law was named after scientist Jacques Charles, who formulated the original law in his unpublished work from the 1780s.

In two of a series of four essays presented between 2 and 30 October 1801, John Dalton demonstrated by experiment that all the gases and vapours that he studied expanded by the same amount between two fixed points of temperature. The French natural philosopher Joseph Louis Gay-Lussac confirmed the discovery in a presentation to the French National Institute on 31 Jan 1802, although he credited the discovery to unpublished work from the 1780s by Jacques Charles. The basic principles had already been described by Guillaume Amontons and Francis Hauksbee a century earlier.

Dalton was the first to demonstrate that the law applied generally to all gases, and to the vapours of volatile liquids if the temperature was well above the boiling point. Gay-Lussac concurred. With measurements only at the two thermometric fixed points of water (0°C and 100°C), Gay-Lussac was unable to show that the equation relating volume to temperature was a linear function. On mathematical grounds alone, Gay-Lussac's paper does not permit the assignment of any law stating the linear relation. Both Dalton's and Gay-Lussac's main conclusions can be expressed mathematically as:

$$V_{100} - V_0 = kV_0\,$$

where V_{100} is the volume occupied by a given sample of gas at 100 °C; V_{0} is the volume occupied by the same sample of gas at 0 °C; and k is a constant which is the same for all gases at constant pressure. This equation does not contain the temperature and so is not what became known as Charles's Law. Gay-Lussac's value for k (1/2.6666), was identical to Dalton's earlier value for vapours and remarkably close to the present-day value of 1/2.7315. Gay-Lussac gave credit for this equation to unpublished statements by his fellow Republican citizen J. Charles in 1787. In the absence of a firm record, the gas law relating volume to temperature cannot be attributed to Charles. Dalton's measurements had much more scope regarding temperature than Gay-Lussac, not only measuring the volume at the fixed points of water but also at two points. Unaware of the inaccuracies of mercury thermometers at the time, which were divided into equal portions between the fixed points, Dalton, after concluding in Essay II that in the case of vapours, “any elastic fluid expands nearly in a uniform manner into 1370 or 1380 parts by 180 degrees (Fahrenheit) of heat”, was unable to confirm it for gases.

== Relation to absolute zero ==
Charles's law appears to imply that the volume of a gas will descend to zero at a certain temperature (−266.66 °C according to Gay-Lussac's figures) or −273.15 °C. Gay-Lussac was clear in his description that the law was not applicable at low temperatures:

but I may mention that this last conclusion cannot be true except so long as the compressed vapours remain entirely in the elastic state; and this requires that their temperature shall be sufficiently elevated to enable them to resist the pressure which tends to make them assume the liquid state.

At absolute zero temperature, the gas possesses zero energy and hence the molecules restrict motion. Gay-Lussac had no experience of liquid air (first prepared in 1877), although he appears to have believed (as did Dalton) that the "permanent gases" such as air and hydrogen could be liquified. Gay-Lussac had also worked with the vapours of volatile liquids in demonstrating Charles's law, and was aware that the law does not apply just above the boiling point of the liquid:

I may, however, remark that when the temperature of the ether is only a little above its boiling point, its condensation is a little more rapid than that of atmospheric air. This fact is related to a phenomenon which is exhibited by a great many bodies when passing from the liquid to the solid-state, but which is no longer sensible at temperatures a few degrees above that at which the transition occurs.

The first mention of a temperature at which the volume of a gas might descend to zero was by William Thomson (later known as Lord Kelvin) in 1848:

This is what we might anticipate when we reflect that infinite cold must correspond to a finite number of degrees of the air-thermometer below zero; since if we push the strict principle of graduation, stated above, sufficiently far, we should arrive at a point corresponding to the volume of air being reduced to nothing, which would be marked as −273° of the scale (−100/.366, if .366 be the coefficient of expansion); and therefore −273° of the air-thermometer is a point which cannot be reached at any finite temperature, however low.

However, the "absolute zero" on the Kelvin temperature scale was originally defined in terms of the second law of thermodynamics, which Thomson himself described in 1852. Thomson did not assume that this was equal to the "zero-volume point" of Charles's law, merely said that Charles's law provided the minimum temperature which could be attained. The two can be shown to be equivalent by Ludwig Boltzmann's statistical view of entropy (1870).

However, Charles also stated:

The volume of a fixed mass of dry gas increases or decreases by 1/273 times the volume at 0 °C for every 1 °C rise or fall in temperature. Thus:

$$V_T=V_0+(\tfrac{1}{273}\times V_0 )\times T$$

$$V_T=V_0 (1+\tfrac{T}{273})$$

where V_{T} is the volume of gas at temperature T (in degrees Celsius), V_{0} is the volume at 0 °C.

== Relation to kinetic theory ==
The kinetic theory of gases relates the macroscopic properties of gases, such as pressure and volume, to the microscopic properties of the molecules which make up the gas, particularly the mass and speed of the molecules. To derive Charles's law from kinetic theory, it is necessary to have a microscopic definition of temperature: this can be conveniently taken as the temperature being proportional to the average kinetic energy of the gas molecules, E̅_{k}:

$$T \propto \bar{E_{\rm k}}.\,$$

Under this definition, the demonstration of Charles's law is almost trivial. The kinetic theory equivalent of the ideal gas law relates PV to the average kinetic energy:

$$PV = \frac{2}{3} N \bar{E_{\rm k}}\,$$

== See also ==
- Boyle's law – Relation between gas pressure and volume
- Combined gas law – Combination of Charles', Boyle's and Gay-Lussac's gas laws
- Gay-Lussac's law – Relationship between pressure and temperature of a gas at constant volume
- Avogadro's law – Relationship between volume and amount of a gas at constant temperature and pressure
- Ideal gas law – Equation of the state of a hypothetical ideal gas
- Hand boiler – Science demonstrator and novelty item
- Thermal expansion – Tendency of matter to change volume in response to a change in temperature
