= Helen Freedhoff =

Canadian theoretical physicist (1940–2017)

- Helen Freedhoff, 1961
- Born: Helen Sarah Goodman; January 9, 1940; Toronto, Ontario
- Died: June 10, 2017 (aged 77); Muskoka, Ontario
- Education: Harbord Collegiate Institute; University of Toronto
- Known for: Theoretical study of atom-photon interaction; First woman physics professor at York University
- Spouse: Stephen Freedhoff
- Children: Michal Freedhoff; Yoni Freedhoff
- Scientific career
- Fields: Theoretical physics
- Workplaces: Imperial College, London; York University, Toronto
- Thesis: Theory of dipole-dipole interaction in coherent radiation processes (1965)
- Notable students: Terry Rudolph (PBR theorem)

Helen Sarah Freedhoff (January 9, 1940 – June 10, 2017) was a Canadian theoretical physicist who studied the interaction of light with atoms. She gained her doctorate at the University of Toronto in 1965 and completed a postdoctoral fellowship at Imperial College in London. Freedhoff was the first woman appointed as a physics professor at York University in Toronto, and is believed to have been the only woman professor of theoretical physics in Canada at the time.

== Early life and education ==
Helen Freedhoff was born Helen Sarah Goodman in Toronto on 9 January 1940. Her parents were Ethel (Kohl) and Sholom Goodman and she had two brothers, David and Irving. Her nickname was "Henchy".

In 1957 she graduated from Harbord Collegiate Institute, a downtown public high school with predominantly Jewish students and a history of many earlier notable alumni. Pursuing an academic career in science was unusual for a woman in North America in the post-war 1950s, where young men entered science in great numbers and women were pressured to make way. At Harbord, however, Freedhoff did not face opposition, recalling "In high school it never occurred to me that I would have to play dumb to get dates. Nobody ever really discouraged me. The teachers really encouraged me, and nobody taught me that there was anything wrong with having a career".

Freedhoff enrolled in the Mathematics, Physics, and Chemistry stream at the University of Toronto, one of around 10-15 women among 120 first year students. Originally intending to study mathematics, she found that she preferred physics. Freedhoff was the only woman in her year to major in physics, graduating with the highest marks and being awarded the Governor General's Gold Medal. She did not feel professionally disadvantaged by being the only woman, and felt it could be an advantage to stand out.

Freedhoff had summer jobs in Harold Johns' biophysics lab. Johns was a pioneer of medical biophysics, developing cobalt radiation therapy for cancer in the 1940s. Although she enjoyed her time there, and was interested in the work Harry Welsh was doing on lasers, laboratory work was not her forte. Freedhoff was inspired by Jan Van Kranendonk, a theoretical physicist, who encouraged her to undertake postgraduate studies under his supervision. From then on, she dedicated her career to what she has described as "the exhilaration of scientific research" and teaching. "Basic science," she wrote, "is indeed a high form of culture, no less so than music or literature because it is also useful".

== Career and research ==
Although women gained nearly 20% of the doctoral degrees awarded in physics by the University of Toronto between 1890 and 1933, Freedhoff was only the second woman to gain a PhD in physics after 1934 at the University of Toronto, following Olga Mracek Mitchell in 1962. Freedhoff earned her PhD in 1965 with a dissertation titled Theory of dipole-dipole interaction in coherent radiation processes. Women were awarded only 5% of the physics doctorates at the University of Toronto between 1960 and 1975.

Freedhoff was awarded a postdoctoral fellowship by the National Research Council of Canada, working at Imperial College, London, from 1965 to 1967. She studied means of identifying molecular features of atoms trapped in metals with spectroscopy, work which was partly sponsored by the United States Air Force Office of Scientific Research.

While in London, she wrote to the physics department at York University in Toronto enquiring about job opportunities. In 1967, she was appointed assistant professor in physics there, the university's first woman professor in physics and believed to be Canada's only woman professor in theoretical physics at that time.

Other than a sabbatical year at the Department of Physics of Technion, the Israel Institute of Technology in Haifa from 1986, Freedhoff remained at York University until her retirement in 2005, having published over 40 research papers. She also collaborated with physicists in Australia, which led to Terry Rudolph undertaking his doctoral studies under Freedhoff's supervision in the 1990s. He is a professor of physics at Imperial College, and together with Matthew Pusey and Jonathan Barrett, one of the developers of the PBR theorem, an important development in quantum mechanics named for its three authors. Rudolph, who is Erwin Schrödinger's grandson, delivered one of the eulogies at Freedhoff's funeral.

== Personal life ==
Freedhoff married Stephen Freedhoff when she was around 20. Stephen Freedhoff had graduated with a bachelor of commerce from the University of Toronto in 1957, going on to a career as a chartered accountant and consultant. They had a daughter, Michal Ilana Freedhoff, a son, Yoni Freedhoff, and seven grandchildren. Michal Freedhoff gained a doctorate in solid state chemistry, and went on to serve as a US Congressional Science and Engineering Fellow in the office of Ed Markey. She subsequently worked in a variety of government environmental protection roles, and was appointed Assistant Administrator for the Office of Chemical Safety and Pollution Prevention (OCSPP) of the US Environmental Protection Agency (EPA) in 2021. Yoni Freedhoff is an associate professor of Family Medicine at the University of Ottawa and author. Helen Freedhoff's personal pastimes included reading, playing piano, solving KenKen puzzles, and yoga.

Helen Freedhoff died suddenly on 10 June 2017 at the family's cottage in Muskoka, Ontario, a lakeside area near Toronto.

== Selected publications ==
- W.R. Bruce, M.L. Pearson, Helen S. Freedhoff. The Linear Energy Transfer Distributions Resulting from Primary and Scattered X-Rays and Gamma Rays with Primary HVL's from 1.25 mm Cu to 11 mm Pb. Radiation Research, 19 (4): 606-620.
- Helen Freedhoff, J. Van Kranendonk (1967). Theory of coherent resonant absorption and emission at infrared and optical frequencies. Can. J. Physics, 45(5): 1833-1859.
- Helen S. Freedhoff (1979). Collective atomic effects in resonance fluorescence: Dipole-dipole interaction. Phys. Rev. A 19, 1132.
- Helen S. Freedhoff (1982). Collective atomic effects in resonance fluorescence: The "scaling factor". Phys. Rev. A 26, 684.
- Helen Freedhoff, Zhidang Chen (1990). Resonance fluorescence of a two-level atom in a strong bichromatic field. Phys. Rev. A 41, 6013.
- Tran Quang, Helen Freedhoff (1993). Index of refraction of a system of strongly driven two-level atoms. Phys. Rev. A 48, 3216.
- Helen Freedhoff (2004). Evolution in time of an N-atom system. I. A physical basis set for the projection of the master equation. Physical Review A. 69 (1).
