= Meinhard von Pfaundler =

Austrian pediatrician (1872–1947)

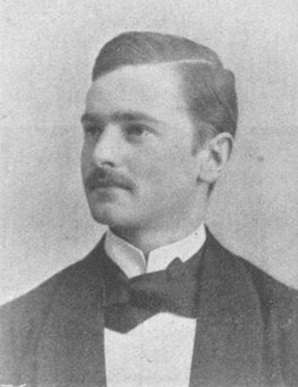
Image of Meinhard Pfaundler

Meinhard von Pfaundler (name sometimes given as Meinhard Pfaundler von Hadermur); (7 June 1872 – 20 June 1947) was an Austrian pediatrician born in Innsbruck. He was the son of Leopold Pfaundler.

In 1890, he began his medical studies in Innsbruck with anatomist Wilhelm Roux (1850-1924). Shortly afterwards he transferred to the University of Graz, where he was influenced by neurologist Gabriel Anton (1858-1933), gynecologist Alfons von Rosthorn (1857-1909), histologist Alexander Rollett (1834-1903), internist Friedrich Kraus (1858-1936) and pediatrician Theodor Escherich (1857-1911), who was also his brother-in-law. After receiving his doctorate, he became an assistant to Franz Hofmeister (1850-1922) at the University of Strasbourg. He was habilitated for pediatrics in 1900 at the University of Graz, becoming an associate professor and director of its children’s clinic two years later. In 1906, he was appointed director of the university children's hospital in Munich. He would remain in Munich for the remainder of his career.

Pfaundler made contributions in all facets of pediatric medicine. He was particularly interested in the diathetic (hereditary and/or biological predisposition to a disorder) aspects of disease. Another focus involved "social pediatrics", stressing the importance of nursing, education, hygiene and psychological concerns when dealing with children. In his later research he was concerned with issues such as genetics and natural selection.

== Eponyms ==
- "Pfaundler's reaction": Mixture of serum consisting of typhoid agglutinin with typhoid bacteria will cause the bacteria, when incubated, to develop into threads.
- "Pfaundler-Hurler syndrome": A metabolical disorder characterized by dwarfism, a hunchback, gargoyle-like facial expressions, mental retardation, plus other abnormalities. Named with his assistant, pediatrician Gertrud Hurler (1889-1965).

== Written works ==
- Handbuch der Kinderheilkunde. Leipzig, (1906). with Arthur Schlossmann (1867-1932); four volumes, later translated into English as "The Diseases of Children; a work for the practising physician".
- Über Magencapacität und Gastrektasie. Stuttgart, 1898.
- Physiologisches, Bacteriologisches und Klinisches über Lumbalpunctionen an Kindern. Vienna and Leipzig, (1899).
- Die K. Univer.-Kinderklinik im Dr. von Haunerschen Kinderspital zu München. (1911). In reference to August Hauner (1811-1884), who founded a private children’s hospital in Munich.
- Über kombinierte Krankheitsbereitschaften oder Diathesen im Kindesalter, in: Therapie d. Gegenwart 13, 1911, S. 289-99, 361-72.
- Physiologie des Neugeborenen. in Albert Döderlein's "Handbuch für Geburtshilfe". Volume 1. Munich and Wiesbaden, 1915; 2nd edition, 1924.
