= Gottstein =

Gottstein is a surname, meaning "God's rock" in German. Notable people with the surname include:

- Adolf Gottstein (1857–1941), German social hygienist and epidemiologist
- Anton Gottstein (1893–1982), Czech cross-country skier
- James Gottstein, American lawyer
- Thomas Gottstein (born 1964), Swiss banker
