= Leopold Pfaundler =

Austrian scientist (1839–1920)

Leopold Pfaundler von Hadermur (14 February 1839 – 6 May 1920) was an Austrian physicist and chemist born in Innsbruck. He was the father of pediatrician Meinhard von Pfaundler (1872–1947), and the father-in-law of pediatrician Theodor Escherich (1857–1911).

== Biography ==
He studied under chemist Heinrich Hlasiwetz (1825–1875) at the University of Innsbruck, with Justus von Liebig (1803–1873) at the Ludwig-Maximilians-Universität München, and with Henri Victor Regnault (1810–1878) and Charles Adolphe Wurtz (1817–1884) at the University of Paris. In 1861, he received his doctorate, and in 1867 was appointed professor of physics at the University of Innsbruck. In 1891, he succeeded Ludwig Boltzmann (1844–1906) as professor of physics at the University of Graz. In 1887, he became a full member of the Vienna Academy of Sciences.

Pfaundler is remembered today for his kinetic-molecular explanation of gas reactions under the condition of equilibrium. He was the inventor of a number of scientific apparatuses — devices he often utilized in classroom demonstrations. These included a temperature regulator (1863), a Stromkalorimeter (1869), a differential air thermometer (1875), a seismograph (1897) and a distance meter (1915), to name a few. He is also credited with creating a device for optical demonstration of Lissajous figures (1873).

From 1863 to 1864, he performed a survey of the Stubaier Alps with Ludwig Barth zu Barthenau (1839–1890), and in 1864 he was the first person to ascend to the summit of the Hofmannspitze (3112m).

== Selected written works ==
- Die Physik des täglichen Lebens, gemeinverständlich dargestellt (1906).
- Die physik des täglichen Lebens mit 467 Abbildungen (1913).
- Ueber die Wärmekapazität des Wassers und eine Methode den Ort ihres Minimums zu messen (1915).
- Ueber einen neuen Distanzmesser (1915).
- Chronik der Familie Pfaundler von 1486 bis 1915 (1915).
- Die Innsbrucker Studenten-Kompagnie 1859 und 1866 (1917).
- Das chinesisch-japanische GO-Spiel: eine systematische Darstellung und Anleitung zum Spielen desselben.

He also published Müller-Pouillet's Lehrbuch der Physik und Meteorologie ("Johann Heinrich Jakob Müller–Claude Pouillet's textbook of physics and meteorology"), (9th edition, 1886–98, 3 volumes).

== Awards and honors ==
Pfaundler’s 1867 publication entitled “Beiträge zur chemischen Statik” [“A Contribution to Chemical Statics”] was a major contribution to the kinetic theory of chemical reactions. This publication was honored by a Citation for Chemical Breakthrough Award from the Division of History of Chemistry of the American Chemical Society presented to the University of Innsbruck in 2016.
