= Erwin Schrödinger =

Austrian physicist (1887–1961)

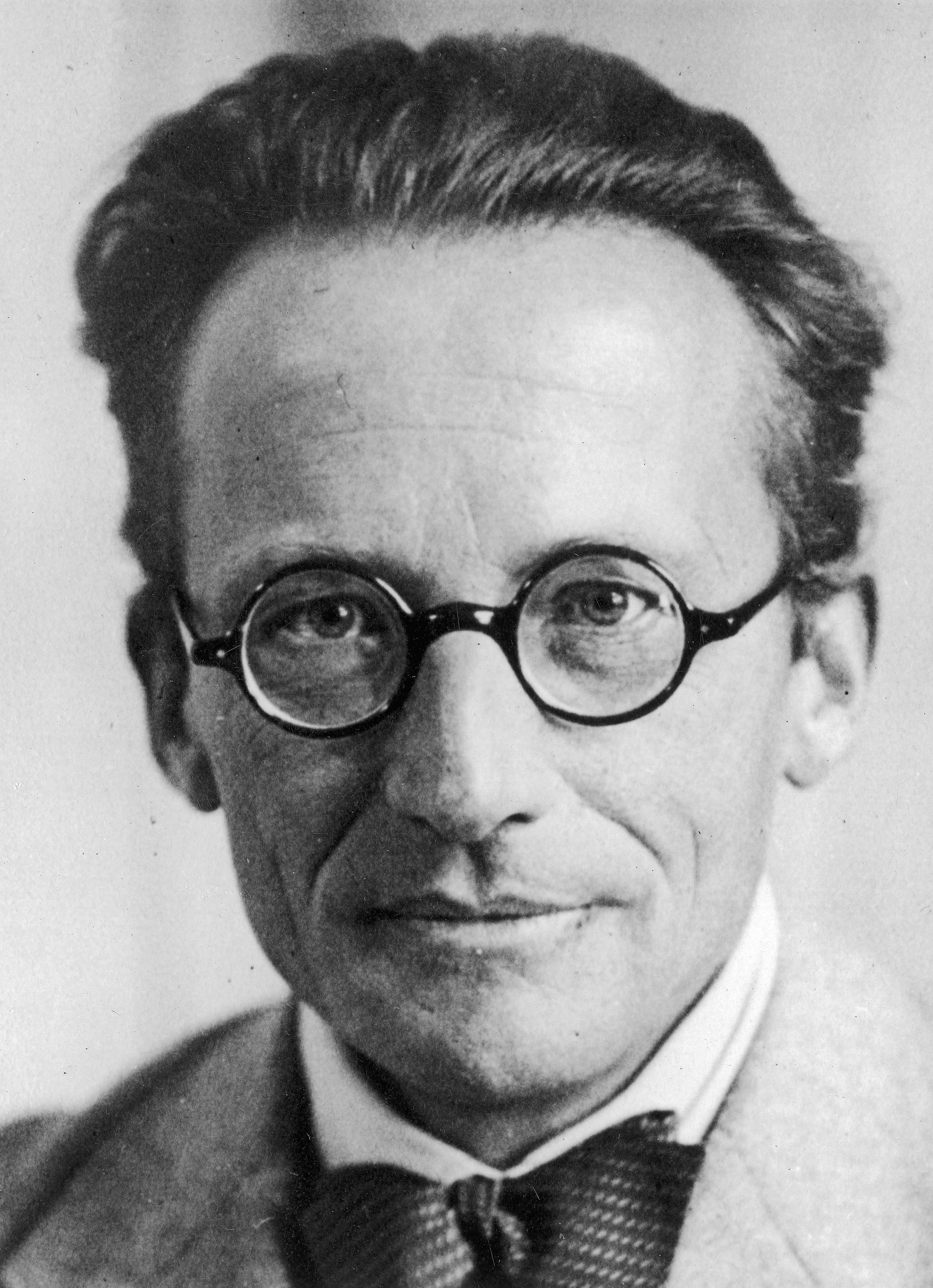
- Schrödinger in 1933
- Born: Erwin Rudolf Josef Alexander Schrödinger; 12 August 1887; Vienna, Austria-Hungary
- Died: 4 January 1961 (aged 73); Vienna, Austria
- Citizenship: Austria; Ireland (nat. 1948)
- Education: University of Vienna (PhD, DSc)
- Known for: Schrödinger's cat; Schrödinger equation; Schrödinger field; Schrödinger group; Schrödinger picture; Schrödinger–HJW theorem; Quantum entanglement; Quantum steering
- Spouse: Annemarie Bertel (m. 1920)
- Children: 1
- Father: Rudolf Schrödinger
- Relatives: Terry Rudolph (grandson)
- Awards: Matteucci Medal (1927); Nobel Prize in Physics (1933); Max Planck Medal (1937); Erwin Schrödinger Prize (1956)
- Scientific career
- Fields: Physics
- Workplaces: University of Zurich; University of Berlin; Magdalen College, Oxford; University of Graz; Dublin Institute for Advanced Studies
- Thesis: Über die Leitung der Elektrizität auf der Oberfläche von Isolatoren an feuchter Luft (1910)
- Doctoral advisor: Friedrich Hasenöhrl
- Other academic advisors: Franz S. Exner
- Writing career
- Subject: Genetics
- Notable work: What Is Life? (1944)

Erwin Rudolf Josef Alexander Schrödinger (Note: /ˈʃroʊdɪŋər/ SHROH-ding-er; German: [ˈʃʁøːdɪŋɐ]; sometimes anglicized as Schroedinger or Schrodinger.) (12 August 1887 – 4 January 1961) was an Austrian theoretical physicist who developed fundamental results in quantum theory. In particular, he is recognized for devising the Schrödinger equation, an equation that provides a way to calculate the wave function of a system and how it changes dynamically in time. He coined the term "quantum entanglement" in 1935. Schrödinger shared the 1933 Nobel Prize in Physics with Paul Dirac "for the discovery of new productive forms of atomic theory".

In addition, Schrödinger wrote many works on various aspects of physics: statistical mechanics and thermodynamics, physics of dielectrics, color theory, electrodynamics, general relativity, and cosmology, and he made several attempts to construct a unified field theory. In his book, What Is Life?, Schrödinger addressed the problems of genetics, looking at the phenomenon of life from the point of view of physics. He also paid great attention to the philosophical aspects of science, ancient and oriental philosophical concepts, ethics, and religion. He also wrote on philosophy and theoretical biology. In popular culture, he is best known for "Schrödinger's cat", a thought experiment. He and Dirac tied for eighth in a Physics World poll of the greatest physicists of all time.

In his personal life, he lived with both his wife and his mistress which may have led to problems causing him to leave his position at Oxford. Subsequently, until 1938, he had a position in Graz, Austria, until the Nazi takeover when he fled, finally finding a long-term arrangement in Dublin, Ireland, where he remained until retirement in 1955. He returned to Vienna in 1956, with an emeritus professor position, and died of tuberculosis in 1961. In 1989, allegations of sexual abuse of several minors emerged. In 2026, a defence was published challenging some of these allegations.

== Early life and education ==
Erwin Rudolf Josef Alexander Schrödinger was born on 12 August 1887 in Vienna, the only child of Rudolf Schrödinger, a botanist, and Georgine Emilia Brenda Bauer, the daughter of a chemistry professor at TU Wien. His mother was of half Austrian and half English descent. His father was Catholic and his mother was Lutheran. Although Schrödinger was an atheist, he had strong interests in Eastern religions and pantheism, and used religious symbolism in his works. He believed his scientific work was an approach to divinity in an intellectual sense.

Schrödinger was also able to learn English outside school, as his maternal grandmother was British. In 1906, he entered the University of Vienna as a student of Wilhelm Wirtinger, Franz S. Exner, and Friedrich Hasenöhrl, receiving a Doctor of Philosophy in 1910 under the supervision of Hasenöhrl. He also conducted experimental work with Karl Wilhelm Friedrich "Fritz" Kohlrausch. After obtaining his doctorate, Schrödinger became an assistant to Exner in the second Physical Institute, where he completed his habilitation in 1914.

== Career ==
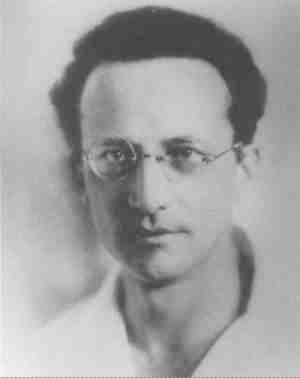
Schrödinger as a young man, c. 1914

From 1914 to 1918, Schrödinger participated in war work as a commissioned officer in the Austrian fortress artillery (Gorizia, Duino, Sistiana, Prosecco, Vienna). In 1920, he became an assistant to Max Wien at the University of Jena, and in September attained the position of ausserordentlicher Professor (associate professor) at the University of Stuttgart. The following year, he became ordentlicher Professor (full professor) at the University of Breslau.

In 1921, Schrödinger moved to the University of Zurich. In 1927, he succeeded Max Planck at the University of Berlin. In 1933, he decided to leave Germany because he strongly disapproved of the Nazis' antisemitism. He became a Fellow of Magdalen College, Oxford. Soon after arriving, he received the Nobel Prize in Physics together with Paul Dirac. His position at Oxford did not work out well; his unconventional domestic arrangements, sharing living quarters with two women, were not met with acceptance. In 1934, he lectured at Princeton University; he was offered a permanent position there, but did not accept it. Again, his wish to set up house with his wife and his mistress may have created a problem. He had the prospect of a position at the University of Edinburgh, but visa delays occurred, and in the end he took up a position at the University of Graz in 1936. He had also accepted the offer of chair position at the Department of Physics at Allahabad University in India.

In the midst of these tenure issues in 1935, after extensive correspondence with Albert Einstein, Schrödinger proposed what is now called the "Schrödinger's cat" thought experiment. In 1938, after the German annexation of Austria, Schrödinger had problems in Graz because of his flight from Germany in 1933 and his known opposition to Nazism. He issued a statement recanting this opposition, which he later regretted, explaining to Einstein: "I wanted to remain free – and could not do so without great duplicity". However, this did not fully appease the new dispensation, and the University of Graz dismissed him from his post for "political unreliability". He suffered harassment and was instructed not to leave the country, but fled to Italy with his wife. From there, he took up visiting positions at Oxford and Ghent universities.

=== Dublin ===
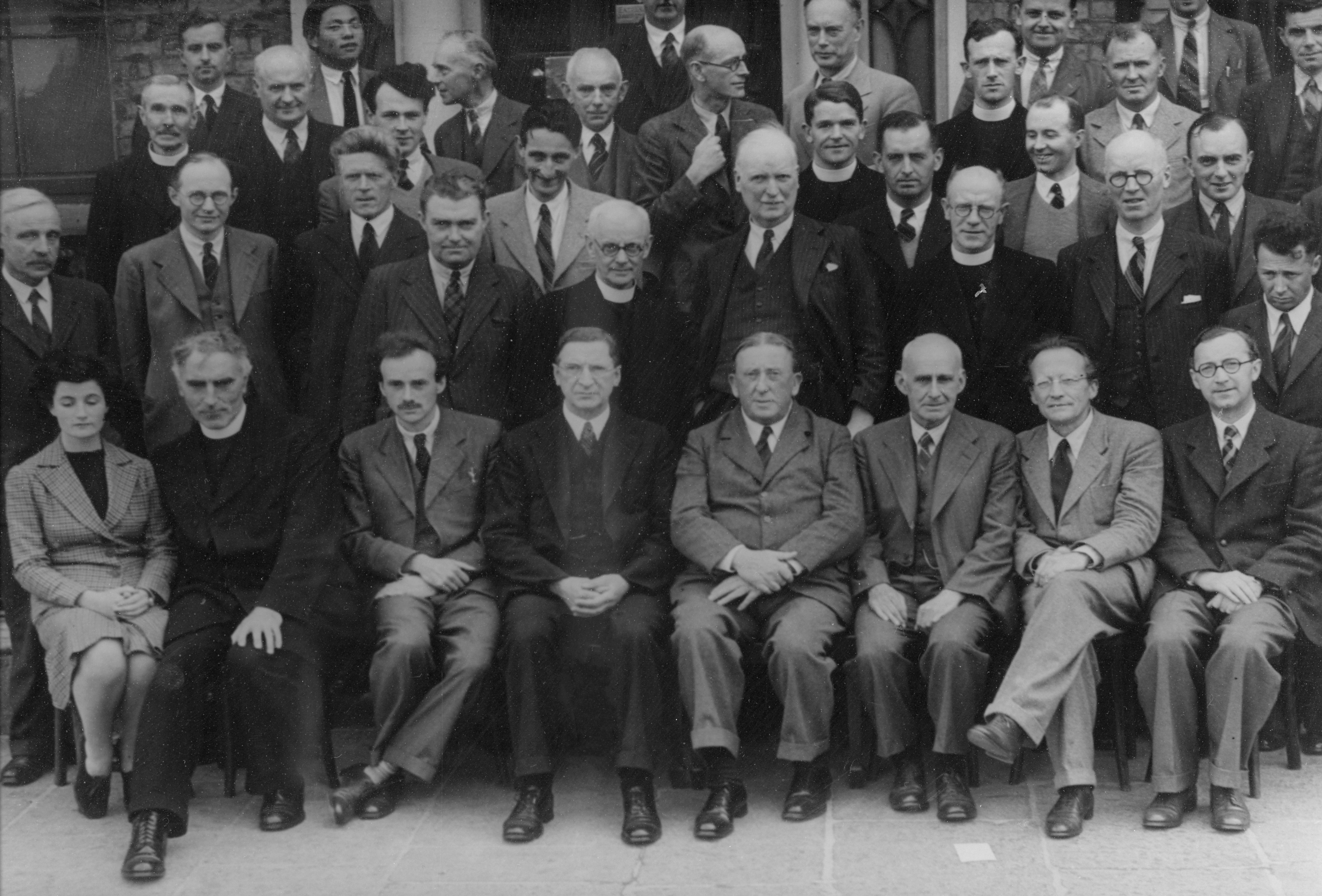
Schrödinger (front row 2nd from right) and De Valera (front row 4th from left) at the Dublin Institute for Advanced Studies, 1942

In 1939, Schrödinger received a personal invitation from Éamon de Valera, Ireland's Taoiseach, to reside in Dublin. The following year, he joined the newly-established Dublin Institute for Advanced Studies as Director of the School of Theoretical Physics, a position he held until his retirement in 1955. He lived modestly on Kincora Road, Clontarf; a plaque has been erected at his Clontarf residence and at the address of his workplace in Merrion Square.

Schrödinger believed that, as an Austrian, he had a unique relationship with Ireland; in October 1940, a writer from the Irish Press interviewed Schrödinger, who spoke of the Celtic heritage of Austrians, saying: "I believe there is a deeper connection between us Austrians and the Celts. Names of places in the Austrian Alps are said to be of Celtic origin." He became a naturalized Irish citizen in 1948, but also retained his Austrian citizenship. He published about fifty further papers on various topics, including his explorations of unified field theory. In 1943, Schrödinger gave a series of three major lectures at Trinity College Dublin which remain highly influential at the university. The series began annual conferences in his name, and buildings at the College were named after him.

In 1944, Schrödinger wrote What Is Life?, which contains a discussion of negentropy and the concept of a complex molecule with the genetic code for living organisms. According to James D. Watson's memoir, DNA, the Secret of Life, Schrödinger's book gave Watson the inspiration to research the gene, which led to the discovery of the DNA double helix structure in 1953. Similarly, Francis Crick, in his autobiographical book What Mad Pursuit, described how he was influenced by Schrödinger's speculations about how genetic information might be stored in molecules. A manuscript "Fragment from an unpublished dialogue of Galileo" from this time resurfaced at The King's Hospital boarding school, Dublin, after it was written for the school's 1955 edition of their Blue Coat, Schrödinger's last year in Dublin.

== Later life and death ==
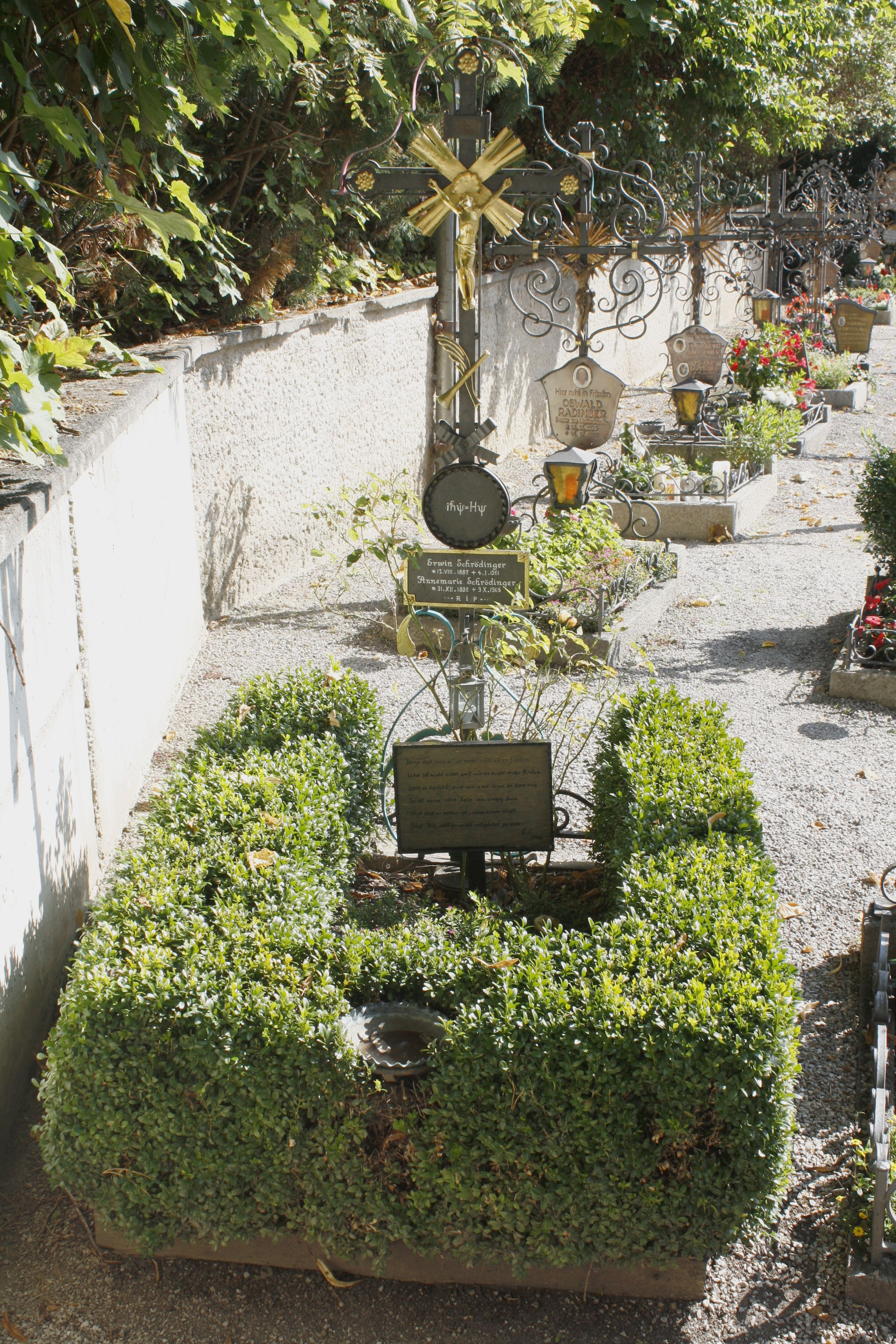
Annemarie and Erwin Schrödinger's gravesite; above the name plate Schrödinger's quantum mechanical wave equation is inscribed on a circular plaque: $i \hbar \dot \Psi = H \Psi$

In 1956, following the neutralization of Austria in 1955, Schrödinger returned to Vienna to become a professor emeritus at the University of Vienna. At an important lecture during the World Power Conference, Schrödinger refused to speak on nuclear power because of his scepticism about it and gave a philosophical lecture instead. During this period, he turned from mainstream quantum mechanics' definition of wave–particle duality and promoted the wave idea alone, causing much controversy.

Schrödinger suffered from tuberculosis and several times in the 1920s stayed at a sanatorium in Arosa, Switzerland. It was there that he formulated his wave equation. Schrödinger died of tuberculosis on 4 January 1961 in Vienna at the age of 73. Although not Catholic, he was buried in a Catholic cemetery in Alpbach, after the priest in charge of the cemetery learnt Schrödinger was a Member of the Pontifical Academy of Sciences.

== Research and interests ==
Early in his life, Schrödinger experimented in the fields of electrical engineering, atmospheric electricity, and atmospheric radioactivity, but he usually worked with his former teacher Franz Exner. He also studied vibrational theory, the theory of Brownian motion, and mathematical statistics. In 1912, at the request of the editors of the Handbook of Electricity and Magnetism, he wrote an article titled Dielectrism. That same year, he gave a theoretical estimate of the probable height distribution of radioactive substances, which is required to explain the observed radioactivity of the atmosphere, and in August 1913 executed several experiments in Zeehame that confirmed his theoretical estimate and those of Victor Hess. For this work, he was awarded the Haitinger Prize of the Austrian Academy of Sciences in 1920.

Other experimental studies conducted by the young researcher in 1914 were checking formulas for capillary pressure in gas bubbles and the study of the properties of soft beta radiation produced by gamma rays striking a metal surface. The last work he performed together with his friend Fritz Kohlrausch. In 1919, he performed his last physical experiment on coherent light and subsequently focused on theoretical studies.

=== Quantum mechanics ===
==== New quantum theory ====
In the first years of his career, Schrödinger became acquainted with the ideas of the old quantum theory, developed in the works of Einstein, Max Planck, Niels Bohr, Arnold Sommerfeld, and others. This knowledge helped him work on some problems in theoretical physics, but the Austrian scientist at the time was not yet ready to part with the traditional methods of classical physics.

Schrödinger's first publications about atomic theory and the theory of spectra began to emerge only from the beginning of the 1920s, after his personal acquaintance with Sommerfeld and Wolfgang Pauli and his move to Germany. In January 1921, Schrödinger finished his first article on this subject, about the framework of the Bohr–Sommerfeld quantization of the interaction of electrons on some features of the spectra of the alkali metals. Of particular interest to him was the introduction of relativistic considerations in quantum theory. In autumn 1922, he analyzed the electron orbits in an atom from a geometric point of view, using methods developed by his friend Hermann Weyl. This work, in which it was shown that quantum orbits are associated with certain geometric properties, was an important step in predicting some of the features of wave mechanics. Earlier in the same year, he created the Schrödinger equation of the relativistic Doppler effect for spectral lines, based on the hypothesis of light quanta and considerations of energy and momentum. He liked the idea of his teacher Exner on the statistical nature of the conservation laws, so he enthusiastically embraced the BKS theory of Bohr, Hans Kramers, and John C. Slater, which suggested the possibility of violation of these laws in individual atomic processes (for example, in the process of emission of radiation). Although the Bothe–Geiger coincidence experiment soon cast doubt on this, the idea of energy as a statistical concept was a lifelong attraction for Schrödinger, and he discussed it in some reports and publications.

==== Wave mechanics ====
In January 1926, Schrödinger published in Annalen der Physik the paper "Quantisierung als Eigenwertproblem" (Quantization as an Eigenvalue Problem) on wave mechanics and presented what is now known as the Schrödinger equation. In this paper, he gave a "derivation" of the wave equation for time-independent systems and showed that it gave the correct energy eigenvalues for a hydrogen-like atom. This paper has been universally celebrated as one of the most important achievements of the twentieth century and created a revolution in most areas of quantum mechanics and indeed of all physics and chemistry. A second paper was submitted just four weeks later that solved the quantum harmonic oscillator, rigid rotor, and diatomic molecule problems and gave a new derivation of the Schrödinger equation. A third paper, published in May, showed the equivalence of his approach to that of Werner Heisenberg's matrix mechanics and gave the treatment of the Stark effect. A fourth paper in this series showed how to treat problems in which the system changes with time, as in scattering problems. In this paper, he introduced a complex solution to the wave equation in order to prevent the occurrence of fourth- and sixth-order differential equations. Schrödinger ultimately reduced the order of the equation to one.

Building on a paper by Einstein, Boris Podolsky, and Nathan Rosen, which introduced the thought-experiment now known as the EPR paradox, Schrödinger published in 1935 a paper that codified the concept of quantum entanglement. He deemed this quantum phenomenon "the one that enforces its entire departure from classical lines of thought." Schrödinger was not entirely comfortable with the implications of quantum theory referring to his theory as "wave mechanics". He wrote about the probability interpretation of quantum mechanics, saying, "I don't like it, and I'm sorry I ever had anything to do with it." (In order to ridicule the viewpoints of Bohr and Heisenberg on quantum mechanics, he contrived the famous thought experiment called the Schrödinger's cat paradox. He was said to have angrily complained to his students that "now the damned Göttingen physicists use my beautiful wave mechanics for calculating their shitty matrix elements.")

==== Unified field theory ====
Following his work on quantum mechanics, Schrödinger devoted considerable effort to working on a unified field theory that would unite gravity, electromagnetism, and nuclear forces within the basic framework of general relativity, doing the work with an extended correspondence with Albert Einstein. In 1947, he announced a result, "Affine Field Theory", in a talk at the Royal Irish Academy, but the announcement was criticized by Einstein as "preliminary" and failed to lead to the desired unified theory. Following the failure of his attempt at unification, Schrödinger gave up his work on unification and turned to other topics. Additionally, Schrödinger reportedly never collaborated with a major physicist for the remainder of his career.

=== Color ===
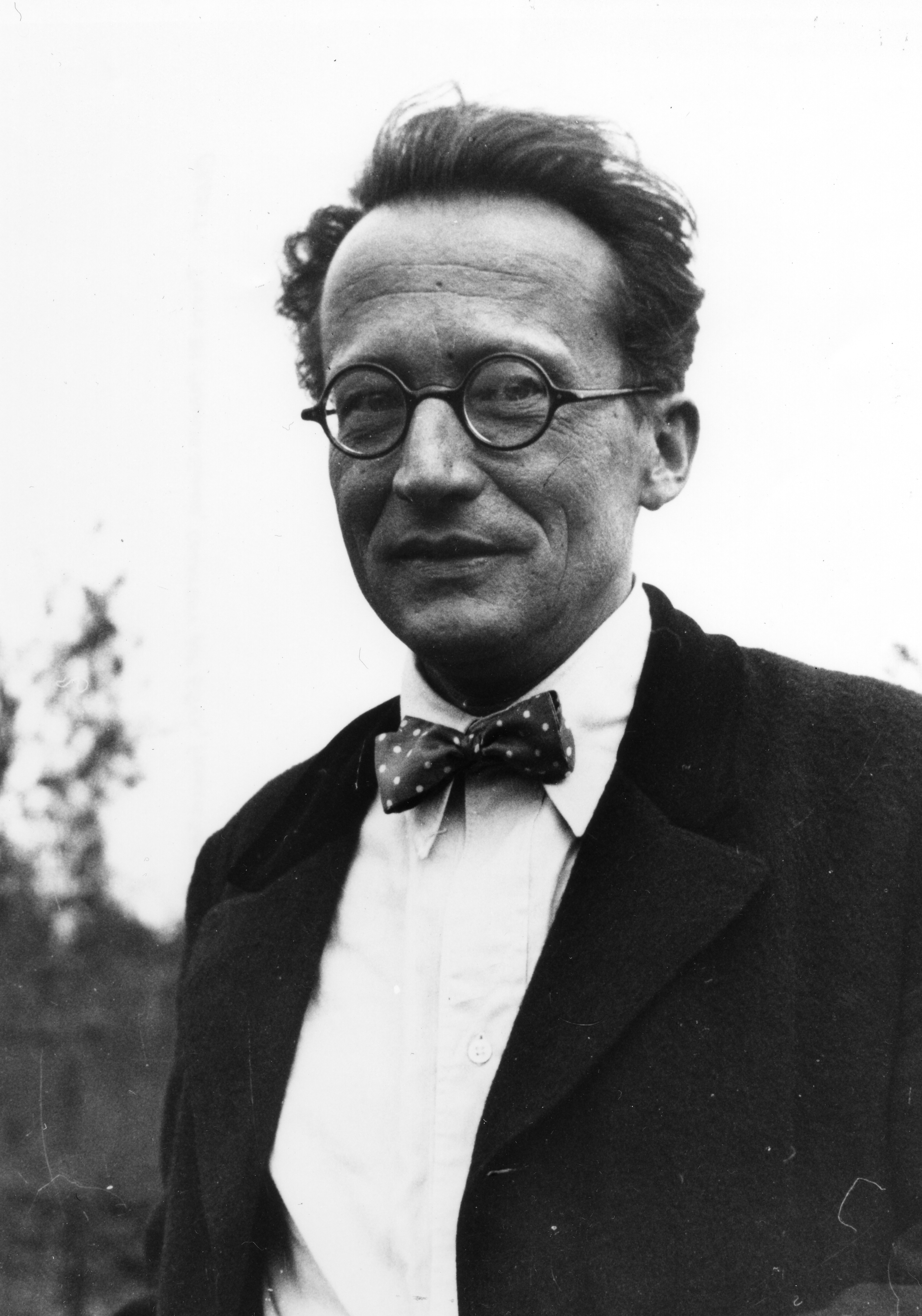
Schrödinger, photographed by Francis Simon

Schrödinger had a strong interest in psychology, in particular color perception and colorimetry (German: Farbenmetrik). He spent quite a few years of his life working on these questions and published a series of papers in this area:

- "Theorie der Pigmente von größter Leuchtkraft", Annalen der Physik, (4), 62, (1920), 603–22 (Theory of Pigments with Highest Luminosity)
- "Grundlinien einer Theorie der Farbenmetrik im Tagessehen", Annalen der Physik, (4), 63, (1920), 397–456; 481–520 (Outline of a theory of colour measurement for daylight vision)
- "Farbenmetrik", Zeitschrift für Physik, 1, (1920), 459–66 (Colour measurement).
- "Über das Verhältnis der Vierfarben- zur Dreifarben-Theorie", Mathematisch-Naturwissenschaftliche Klasse, Akademie der Wissenschaften, Wien, 134, 471, (On The Relationship of Four-Color Theory to Three-Color Theory).
- "Lehre von der strahlenden Energie", Müller-Pouillets Lehrbuch der Physik und Meteorologie, Vol 2, Part 1 (1926) (Thresholds of Color Differences).

His work on the psychology of color perception follows the step of Isaac Newton, James Clerk Maxwell and Hermann von Helmholtz in the same area. Some of these papers have been translated into English and can be found in: Sources of Colour Science, Ed. David L. MacAdam, MIT Press (1970) and in Erwin Schrödinger's Color Theory, Translated with Modern Commentary, Ed. Keith K. Niall, Springer (2017). ISBN 978-3-319-64619-0 doi:10.1007/978-3-319-64621-3.

=== Philosophy ===
Schrödinger had a deep interest in philosophy, and was influenced by the works of Arthur Schopenhauer and Baruch Spinoza. In his 1956 lecture "Mind and Matter", he said that "The world extended in space and time is but our representation." This is a repetition of the first words of Schopenhauer's main work. Schopenhauer's works also introduced him to Indian philosophy, more specifically to the Upanishads and Advaita Vedanta's interpretation. He once took on a particular line of thought: "If the world is indeed created by our act of observation, there should be billions of such worlds, one for each of us. How come your world and my world are the same? If something happens in my world, does it happen in your world, too? What causes all these worlds to synchronize with each other?"

There is obviously only one alternative, namely the unification of minds or consciousnesses. Their multiplicity is only apparent, in truth there is only one mind. This is the doctrine of the Upanishads.

Schrödinger discussed topics such as consciousness, the mind–body problem, sense perception, free will, and objective reality in his lectures and writings. Schrödinger's attitude with respect to the relations between Eastern and Western thought was one of prudence, expressing appreciation for Eastern philosophy while also admitting that some of the ideas did not fit with empirical approaches to natural philosophy. Some commentators have suggested that Schrödinger was so deeply immersed in a non-dualist Vedântic-like view that it may have served as a broad framework or subliminal inspiration for much of his work including that in theoretical physics. Schrödinger expressed sympathy for the idea of tat tvam asi, stating "you can throw yourself flat on the ground, stretched out upon Mother Earth, with the certain conviction that you are one with her and she with you."

Schrödinger said that "Consciousness cannot be accounted for in physical terms. For consciousness is absolutely fundamental. It cannot be accounted for in terms of anything else." He also anticipated the many-worlds interpretation of quantum mechanics. In 1952, he suggested that the different terms of a superposition evolving under the Schrödinger equation are "not alternatives but all really happen simultaneously". Schrödinger's later writings also contain elements resembling the modal interpretation originated by Bas van Fraassen. Because Schrödinger subscribed to a kind of post-Machian neutral monism, in which "matter" and "mind" are only different aspects or arrangements of the same common elements, treating the wavefunction as physical and treating it as information became interchangeable.

== Personal life ==
On 6 April 1920, Schrödinger married Annemarie (Anny) Bertel (born 3 December 1896). The marriage remained childless. By the late 1920s onward, Schrödinger and Anny lived in an open relationship. Schrödinger openly had several extramarital affairs, including with Hildegunde March, the wife of his colleague and friend Arthur March. Anny also had a long-term relationship with Hermann Weyl, which did not affect the friendship between Weyl and Schrödinger. Schrödinger had a daughter with Hildegunde March in 1934. When he immigrated to Ireland in 1938, Schrödinger obtained visas for himself, his wife and March. He wrote to the Taoiseach, Éamon de Valera, personally, so as to obtain a visa for her. In October 1939, the ménage à trois duly took up residence in Dublin.

His wife, Anny, died on 3 October 1965. One of Schrödinger's grandchildren, Terry Rudolph, has followed in his footsteps as a quantum physicist, and teaches at Imperial College London.

=== Sexual abuse allegations ===
Around 1926, at the age of 39, Schrödinger tutored a 14-year-old girl named Itha "Ithi" Junger. Walter Moore relates in his 1989 biography of Schrödinger that the lessons "included 'a fair amount of petting and cuddling'" and Schrödinger "had fallen in love with his pupil". Moore further relates that "not long after her seventeenth birthday, they became lovers". The relationship continued and in 1932 she became pregnant (then aged 20). Moore wrote that "Erwin tried to persuade her to have the child; he said he would take care of it, but he did not offer to divorce [his wife] Anny ... in desperation, Ithi arranged for an abortion."

Moore describes Schrödinger having a "Lolita complex". He quotes from Schrödinger's diary from the time where he said that "men of strong, genuine intellectuality are immensely attracted only by women who, forming the very beginning of the intellectual series, are as nearly connected to the preferred springs of nature as they." A 2021 Irish Times article summarized this as a "predilection for teenage girls", and denounced Schrödinger as "a serial abuser whose behaviour fitted the profile of a paedophile in the widely understood sense of that term." Schrödinger's grandson and daughter were unhappy with the accusation made by Moore, and once the biography was published, their family broke off contact with him, and revoked public access to Schrödinger's journals.

Carlo Rovelli notes in his book Helgoland that Schrödinger "always kept a number of relationships going at once – and made no secret of his fascination with preadolescent girls." In Ireland, Rovelli writes, Schrödinger fathered children from two students, identified in a Der Standard article as being a 26-year-old and a married political activist of unknown age. Moore's book described both of these episodes, giving the name Kate Nolan as a pseudonym for the first and naming the other as Sheila May, although neither was a student. The book also described an episode of Schrödinger being "infatuated" with a twelve-year-old girl, Barbara MacEntee, while in Ireland. He desisted from attentions after a "serious word" from someone, and later "listed her among the unrequited loves of his life." This episode from the book was highlighted by the Irish Times article and others.

Moore stated that Schrödinger's attitude towards women was "that of a male supremacist", but that he disliked the "official misogyny" at Oxford which socially excluded women. Helge Kragh, in his review of Moore's biography, said the "conquest of women, especially very young women, was the salt of life for this sincere romantic and male chauvinist." The physics department of Trinity College Dublin announced in January 2022 that they would recommend a lecture theatre that had been named for Schrödinger since the 1990s be renamed in light of his history of sexual abuse, while a picture of the scientist would be removed, and the renaming of an eponymous lecture series would be considered.

In 2026, Magdalena Gronau and Martin Gronau published a paper that criticised Moore's biography, writing that their "findings suggest that the widely circulated allegations in the media stem from a combination of unprofessional, suggestive biographical writing and poor journalism. They do not substantiate claims of pedophilic or sexually abusive behaviour by Schrödinger."

== Recognition ==
=== Awards ===
Year	Organization	Award	Citation	Ref.
1927	Accademia dei XL	Matteucci Medal	—	
1933	Royal Swedish Academy of Sciences	Nobel Prize in Physics	"For the discovery of new productive forms of atomic theory."	
1937	German Physical Society	Max Planck Medal	—	
1956	Austrian Academy of Sciences	Erwin Schrödinger Prize	—	

=== Memberships ===
Year	Organization	Type	Ref.
1936	Pontifical Academy of Sciences	Academician	
1949	Royal Society	Foreign Member	

=== Honors ===
Year	Country	Order	Ref.
1956	West Germany	Pour le Mérite	

== Commemoration ==
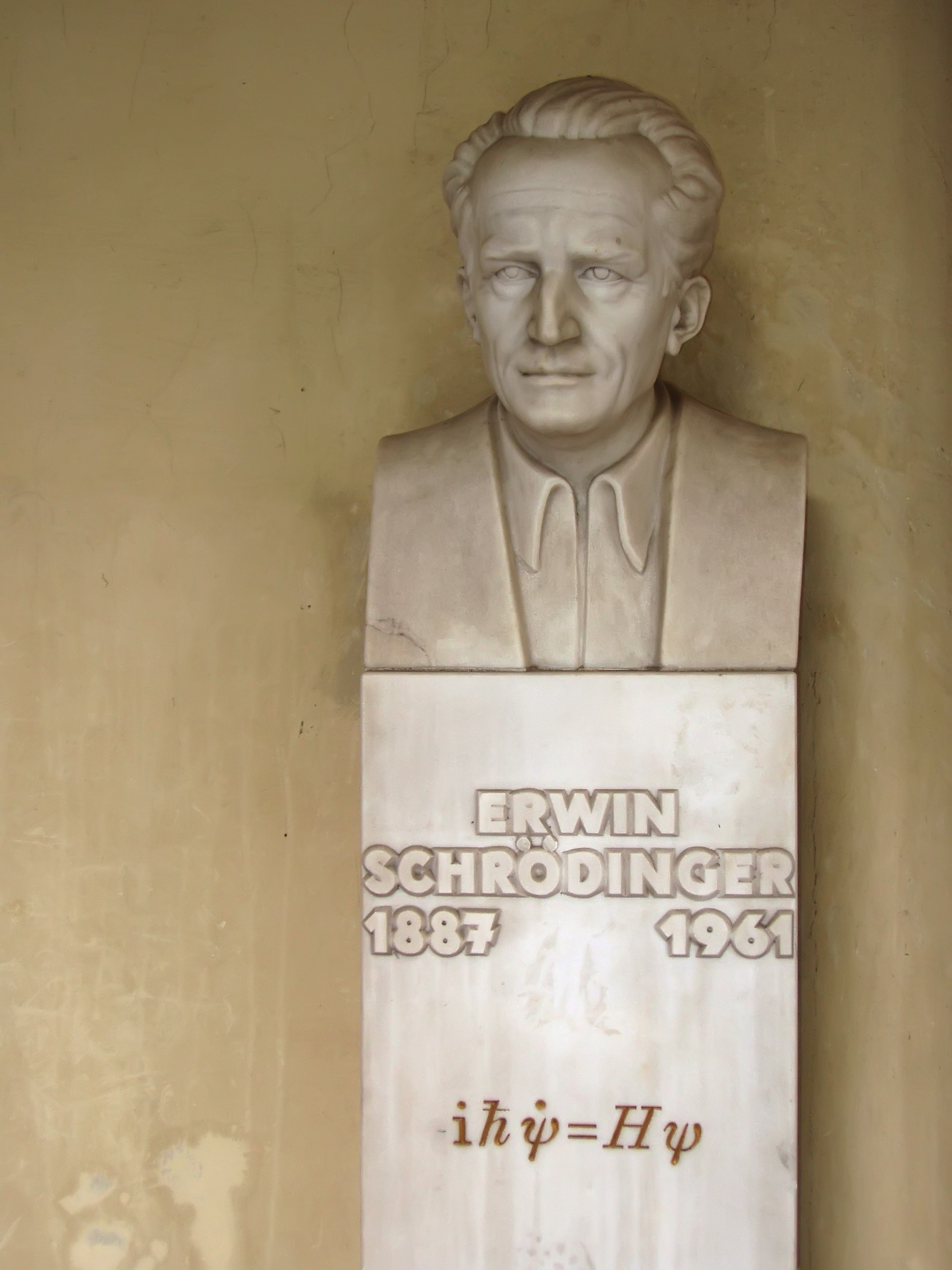
Bust of Schrödinger, in the courtyard arcade of the main building, University of Vienna, Austria

The philosophical issues raised by Schrödinger's cat are still debated today and remain his most enduring legacy in popular science, while Schrödinger's equation is his most enduring legacy at a more technical level. Schrödinger is one of several individuals who have been called "the father of quantum mechanics". Schrödinger crater, on the far side of the Moon, is named after him. The Erwin Schrödinger International Institute for Mathematical Physics was founded in Vienna in 1992.

Schrödinger's portrait was the main feature of the design of the 1983–97 Austrian 1000-schilling banknote, the second-highest denomination. A building is named after him at the University of Limerick in Ireland, as is the Erwin Schrödinger Zentrum in Adlershof, Berlin and the Route Schrödinger at CERN, Prévessin, France. Schrödinger's 126th birthday anniversary in 2013 was celebrated with a Google Doodle.

== Publications ==
- Science and the human temperament, Allen & Unwin (1935), translated and introduced by James Murphy, with a foreword by Ernest Rutherford.
- Nature and the Greeks and Science and Humanism, Cambridge University Press (1996) ISBN 978-0-521-57550-8.
- The Interpretation of Quantum Mechanics, Ox Bow Press (1995) ISBN 978-1-881987-09-3.
- Statistical Thermodynamics, Dover Publications (1989) ISBN 978-0-486-66101-8.
- Collected papers, Friedr. Vieweg & Sohn (1984) ISBN 978-3-7001-0573-2.
- My View of the World, Ox Bow Press (1983) ISBN 978-0-918024-30-5.
- Expanding Universes, Cambridge University Press (1956).
- Space-Time Structure, Cambridge University Press (1950) ISBN 978-0-521-31520-3.
- What Is Life?, Macmillan (1944).
- What Is Life? & Mind and Matter, Cambridge University Press (1974) ISBN 978-0-521-09397-2.

See also the list of Erwin Schrödinger's publications, compiled by Auguste Dick, Gabriele Kerber, Wolfgang Kerber and Karl von Meyenn.
