= Cusanelli =

Cusanelli is an Italian surname.

== List of people with the surname ==
- Christine Cusanelli (born 1972), Canadian politician
- Katelynn Cusanelli, American celebrity

== See also ==
- Cubanelle
- Cusance
