= Terry Rudolph =

British physicist and academic (born 1973)

- Born: 1973 (age 52–53)
- Education: University of Queensland, York University
- Known for: PBR theorem
- Relatives: Erwin Schrödinger (maternal grandfather); Rudolf Schrödinger (great-grandfather)
- Scientific career
- Thesis: Dressing an Atom in a Field of Many Colours (1998)
- Doctoral advisor: Helen Freedhoff

Terry Rudolph (born 1973) is a professor of quantum physics at Imperial College London. He co-founded quantum computing firm PsiQuantum.

== Research ==
Terry Rudolph's research focuses on quantum information and the foundations of quantum mechanics. Notably, he is one of the discoverers of the PBR theorem, which allows for a formal and rigorous test on the ontology of quantum states. This discovery has been hailed as one of the most important in the foundations of quantum theory since Bell's theorem.

After finishing his undergraduate studies at the University of Queensland in 1994, a year of backpacking in Toronto, he decided to do a PhD and chose the nascent field of quantum information. Upon completion of his PhD, under the supervision of Helen Freedhoff at York University in 1998 he lectured for two years at the University of Toronto. After taking a postdoctoral position in Vienna for a year followed by a research position in Bell Labs for two years, he joined Imperial College in 2003 on an Advanced Fellowship. There he was promoted to full professorship in 2012. In 2016 he took a leave from academia and co-founded PsiQuantum, a Silicon Valley-based company that is building a photonic quantum computer.

He is the author of the popular science book ‘Q is for Quantum’.

== Personal life ==
Rudolph is a grandson of Erwin Schrödinger and Hilde March, through their daughter, which he learned about only after he got a physics degree.

== See also ==
- PBR theorem
