= Rudolf Schrödinger =

Austrian industrialist, botanist, and painter (1857–1919)

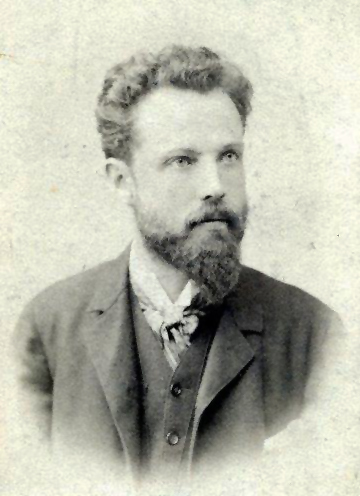
- Portrait of Schrödinger
- Born: 27 January 1857; Vienna, Austria-Hungary
- Died: December 1919 (aged 62); Vienna, Austria
- Occupations: Industrialist; botanist
- Children: Erwin Schrödinger
- Relatives: Terry Rudolph (great-grandson)

Rudolf Schrödinger (27 January 1857 – December 1919) was an Austrian botanist, linoleum and oilcloth manufacturer and visual artist primarily notable as the father of Erwin Schrödinger—the renowned physicist known chiefly for his contributions to quantum mechanics, one of which the Schrödinger equation.

== Background ==
Rudolf Schrödinger was born on 27 January 1857, to a Bavarian family who had migrated to Vienna, then a part of the Austro-Hungarian Empire, several generations prior. Schrödinger described his mother as having been "very nice, with cheerful character; she was of poor health and helpless towards life, but also unassuming."

== Education and career ==
=== Intellectual pursuits ===
Schrödinger studied chemistry in university and acquired competence in the visual arts. Eventually Schrödinger started research as a botanist and published studies concerning plant phylogeny.

=== Business ventures ===
Sometime in the late 19th century, Schrödinger inherited a business that specialized in the production of linoleum and oilcloth. However, he did not harbor much interest in it; nevertheless, he persisted in running it, as it provided a sufficient income for him and his family.

== Personal life ==
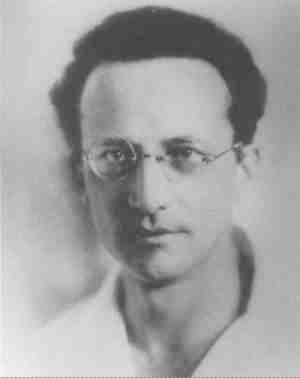
Erwin, his only son, circa 1914

Schrödinger married the second of the three daughters—Georgine Emilia Brenda—of Alexander Bauer, his former professor; he had only one child with her, Erwin Schrödinger, who would go on to become one of the most preeminent physicists ever, remarked especially for his contributions to quantum mechanics, including the formulation of the Schrödinger equation, the introduction of wave functions, the thought experiment known as Schrödinger's Cat, significant contributions to statistical mechanics, and receiving the Nobel Prize in Physics in 1933.

He died in December 1919 at the age of 62.
