= Pouillet effect =

In physics and chemical engineering, the term Pouillet effect refers to an exothermic reaction that takes place when a liquid is added to a powder. Strictly speaking, the heat generated is caused by adhesion of the liquid to the surface of the particles rather than by a chemical reaction. It was first observed in 1802 by physicist John Leslie, who noted that heat was evolved when dry sawdust was wetted with water. Claude Pouillet later described this phenomenon in 1822, and it subsequently became known as the Pouillet effect in France, and then elsewhere.

== Negative Pouillet effect ==
Under certain conditions, a negative Pouillet effect is possible, i.e., heat can be absorbed instead of being released. G. Schwalbe showed that in the case of water below 4 degrees Celsius, the temperature of the system decreases. Joseph Mellor argued that this is due to the negative thermal expansion coefficient of water between 0 and 4 degrees Celsius, with the temperature change $\Delta T$ given by

$\Delta T = {{\alpha T}\over{C_p D}} \Delta P$

where $\alpha$ is the thermal expansion coefficient, $C_P$ is the specific heat, $D$ is the specific gravity, and $\Delta P$ is the applied pressure due to the addition of the liquid. According to this formula, any liquid with a negative thermal expansion coefficient would be expected to exhibit a drop in temperature.
