= PsiQuantum =

American quantum computing company

PsiQuantum, Corp.
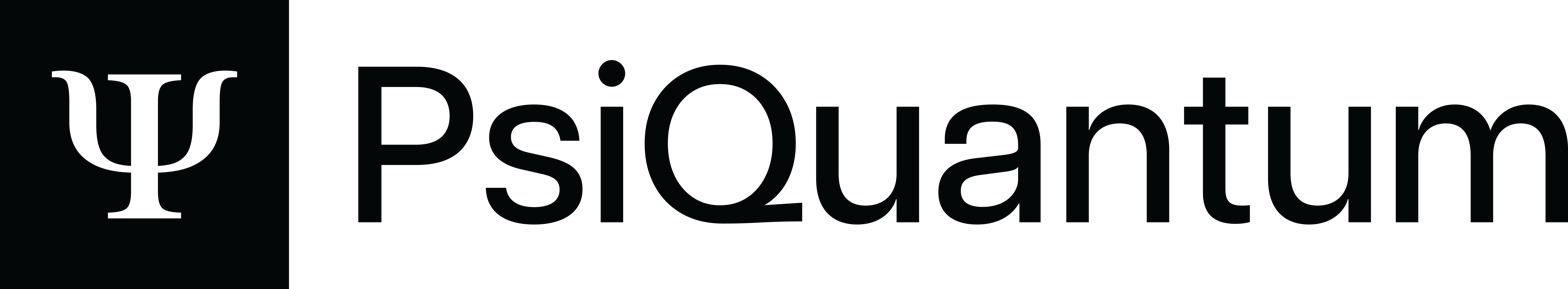
- Type: Private
- Industry: Quantum computing
- Founded: 2016; 10 years ago in Palo Alto, California
- Founders: Jeremy O'Brien; Terry Rudolph; Peter Shadbolt; Mark Thompson
- Headquarters: Palo Alto, California, US
- Key people: Jeremy O'Brien; Terry Rudolph; Peter Shadbolt; Mark Thompson
- Number of employees: 500+ (Worldwide, as of 2026)
- Website: psiquantum.com

PsiQuantum, Corp. is an American quantum computing company based in Palo Alto, California. It is developing utility-scale, fault tolerant quantum computers using silicon photonics. The company has secured government partnerships to build their first systems in Australia and the United States.

== History ==
PsiQuantum was co-founded in 2016 by Jeremy O'Brien, Terry Rudolph, Peter Shadbolt, and Mark Thompson, quantum physicists who were professors or researchers at the University of Bristol and Imperial College London, England. The company’s approach to fault-tolerant quantum computing is based on leveraging photonic qubits and semiconductor manufacturing.

In 2019, PsiQuantum announced a manufacturing partnership with GlobalFoundries to produce silicon photonic quantum devices in a commercial semiconductor foundry in upstate New York.

In early 2021, researchers from PsiQuantum introduced Fusion-Based Quantum Computing (FBQC), a fault-tolerant quantum computing architecture based on entangling measurements and photonic qubits. The company has described FBQC as a key element of its approach to large-scale quantum computing.

In 2022, PsiQuantum began transitioning production into GlobalFoundries' Fab 8 facility in New York. The same year, the company announced a partnership and $22.5 million contract with the U.S. Air Force Research Laboratory (AFRL) focused on photonic quantum technologies.

In 2023, DARPA selected PsiQuantum to participate in its Underexplored Systems for Utility-Scale Quantum Computing (US2QC) program, a predecessor to the Quantum Benchmarking Initiative. Later that year, the company opened an R&D facility at the Science and Technology Facilities Council's Daresbury Laboratory in the United Kingdom and partnered with the Hartree Centre on fault-tolerant quantum computing research.

In January 2024, DARPA advanced PsiQuantum to the second phase of the QBI’s US2QC program, following an evaluation of the company's photonic quantum chips. In April 2024, the Australian Commonwealth and Queensland governments announced an investment package valued at A$940 million to support the company’s construction of a utility-scale, fault-tolerant quantum computer in Queensland. Later that year, PsiQuantum announced plans to build and deploy a quantum computer at the Illinois Quantum and Microelectronics Park in Chicago.

In 2025, DARPA advanced PsiQuantum to the final phase of the US2QC program within QBI, focused on evaluating system architecture, performance, use cases, and economic utility. The company also announced Omega, a silicon photonics chipset designed to integrate the photonic components required for large-scale, fault-tolerant quantum computing. During the year, PsiQuantum raised a $1 billion Series E financing round, launched its Construct software platform for fault-tolerant quantum algorithm development, and broke ground on its site at the Illinois Quantum and Microelectronics Park.

In 2026, PsiQuantum announced that Moreton Bay Central in Queensland would become the site of its Australian quantum computing project. The company also signed a Letter of Intent with the U.S. Department of Commerce for up to $100 million in proposed incentives under the CHIPS and Science Act, and expanded access to its Construct software platform through a free and open-access release.

== See also ==
- Quantum error correction
- Quantum supremacy
- Silicon photonics
