= Jeremy O'Brien =

Australian physicist

Jeremy L. O'Brien
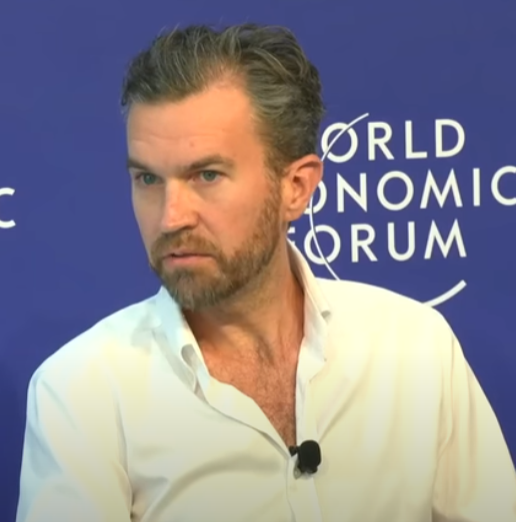
- O'Brien in 2022
- Born: 7 November 1975 (age 50); Australia
- Education: University of New South Wales
- Known for: Variational quantum eigensolver
- Scientific career
- Fields: quantum optics, optical quantum metrology, quantum information science
- Workplaces: University of Queensland, University of Bristol, University of Western Australia

Jeremy O'Brien (born 1975, Australia) is a physicist who researches in quantum optics, optical quantum metrology and quantum information science. He co-founded and is CEO of the quantum computing firm PsiQuantum. Formerly, he was Professorial Research Fellow in Physics and Electrical Engineering at the University of Bristol, and director of its Centre for Quantum Photonics.

His work in optical quantum computing has included the demonstration of the first optical quantum controlled NOT gate.

== Honours and awards ==
- 2009 European Quantum Information Young Investigator Award
- 2010 Adolph Lomb Medal of the Optical Society of America
- 2010 IUPAP Prize in Atomic Molecular and Optical Physics
- 2010 Moseley medal and prize of the Institute of Physics
- 2010 Daiwa Adrian Prize
- 2011 Elected to the Global Young Academy "PsiQuantum Valuation".

== Selected publications ==
- O'Brien, JL; Schofield, S. R.; Simmons, M. Y.; Clark, R. G.; Dzurak, A. S.; Curson, N. J.; Kane, B. E.; McAlpine, N. S.; Hawley, M. E.; Brown, G. W. (2001). "Towards the fabrication of phosphorus qubits for a silicon quantum computer". Physical Review B. 64 (16) 161401. arXiv:cond-mat/0104569. Bibcode:2001PhRvB..64p1401O. doi:10.1103/PhysRevB.64.161401. S2CID 119494991.
- O'Brien, JL; Pryde, GJ; White, AG; Ralph, TC; Branning, D (2003). "Demonstration of an all-optical quantum controlled-NOT gate". Nature. 426 (6964): 264–267. arXiv:quant-ph/0403062. Bibcode:2003Natur.426..264O. doi:10.1038/nature02054. PMID 14628045. S2CID 9883628.
- O'Brien, Jeremy L. (2007). "Optical Quantum Computing". Science. 318 (5856): 1567–1570. arXiv:0803.1554. Bibcode:2007Sci...318.1567O. doi:10.1126/science.1142892. PMID 18063781. S2CID 15701944.
- Politi, Alberto; Cryan, Martin J.; Rarity, John G.; Yu, Siyuan; O'Brien, Jeremy L. (2008). "Silica-on-Silicon Waveguide Quantum Circuits". Science. 320 (5876): 646–9. arXiv:0802.0136. Bibcode:2008Sci...320..646P. doi:10.1126/science.1155441. PMID 18369104. S2CID 3234732.
- O'Brien, Jeremy L. (2008). "Quantum computing over the rainbow". Physics. 1 (23): 23. Bibcode:2008PhyOJ...1...23O. doi:10.1103/Physics.1.23.
