= What Is Life? =

1944 non-fiction science book by Erwin Schrödinger

What Is Life? The Physical Aspect of the Living Cell
- Title pages of 1948 edition
- Author: Erwin Schrödinger
- Language: English
- Genre: Popular science
- Publisher: Cambridge University Press
- Publication date: 1944
- Publication place: United Kingdom (UK)
- Media type: Print
- Pages: 194 pp.
- ISBN: 0-521-42708-8
- OCLC: 24503223
- Dewey Decimal: 574/.01 20
- LC Class: QH331 .S357 1982

What Is Life? The Physical Aspect of the Living Cell is a 1944 science book written for the lay reader by the physicist Erwin Schrödinger. The book was based on a course of public lectures delivered by Schrödinger in February 1943, under the auspices of the Dublin Institute for Advanced Studies, where he was Director of Theoretical Physics, at Trinity College, Dublin. The lectures attracted an audience of about 400, who were warned "that the subject-matter was a difficult one and that the lectures could not be termed popular, even though the physicist’s most dreaded weapon, mathematical deduction, would hardly be utilized." Schrödinger's lecture focused on one important question: "How can the events in space and time which take place within the spatial boundary of a living organism be accounted for by physics and chemistry?"

In the book, Schrödinger introduced the idea of an "aperiodic solid" that contained genetic information in its configuration of covalent chemical bonds. In the 1940s, this idea stimulated enthusiasm for discovering the chemical basis of genetic inheritance. Although the existence of some form of hereditary information had been hypothesized since 1869, its role in reproduction and its helical shape were still unknown at the time of Schrödinger's lecture. In 1953, James D. Watson and Francis Crick jointly proposed the double helix structure of deoxyribonucleic acid (DNA) on the basis of, amongst other theoretical insights, X-ray diffraction experiments conducted by Rosalind Franklin. They both credited Schrödinger's book with presenting an early theoretical description of how the storage of genetic information would work, and each independently acknowledged the book as a source of inspiration for their initial researches.

== The "What is Life?" Lecture Series ==
What is Life? is based on the lecture series of the same name delivered in February 1943 under the auspices of the Dublin Institute for Advanced Studies (DIAS) at Trinity College, Dublin. The lectures were attended by the Irish Taoiseach (Prime Minister) Éamon de Valera and his cabinet. At that time, DNA was known to be a constituent of cell nuclei but had not yet been identified with certainty as the molecular basis of inheritance; the concept of a "heredity molecule" was strictly theoretical, with various candidates. One of the most successful branches of physics at that time was statistical physics. Schrödinger himself is one of the founding fathers of quantum mechanics, a theory which posits a statistical focus for understanding the natural world at subatomic scale.

In 1940, Éamon de Valera had invited Schrödinger to become the first Director of the School of Theoretical Physics at DIAS. Schrödinger, an Austrian physicist who had shared the Nobel Prize in Physics in 1933 for his development of wave-mechanics, had left Nazi Germany and, after sojourns at Oxford, Graz and Ghent, settled in Dublin for what became a sixteen-year tenure, the longest of his life. One of DIAS's statutory requirements was to organise an annual lecture series for a general audience. Schrödinger devised the 1943 series himself and delivered it at Trinity College Dublin (TCD).

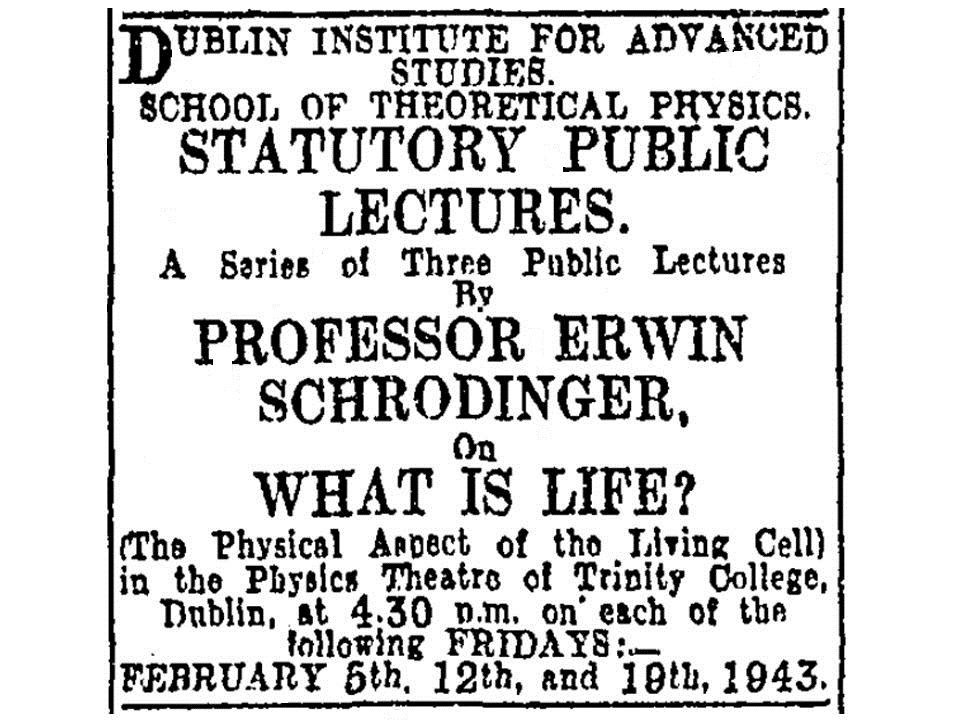
Advertisement for the What is Life? Lectures.

Under the collective title “What is Life?”, Schrödinger presented three public lectures on consecutive Fridays (the 5th, 12th, and 19th) in February 1943 at TCD. The lectures were held in the Physics Lecture Theatre in the Fitzgerald building. By Schrödinger's accounting in What is Life?, the audience numbered about 400 for each lecture. As the Physics Lecture Theatre held only about 150, each lecture is thought to have been repeated on each of the following Mondays. The lectures were widely publicised in The Irish Times, and even received coverage in Time magazine in the U.S. Indeed, on February 6, 1943, The Irish Times published a photograph of Schrödinger with Dr Ernest Alton, Provost of Trinity, and Éamon de Valera standing outside the Physics Building at Trinity before the lecture.

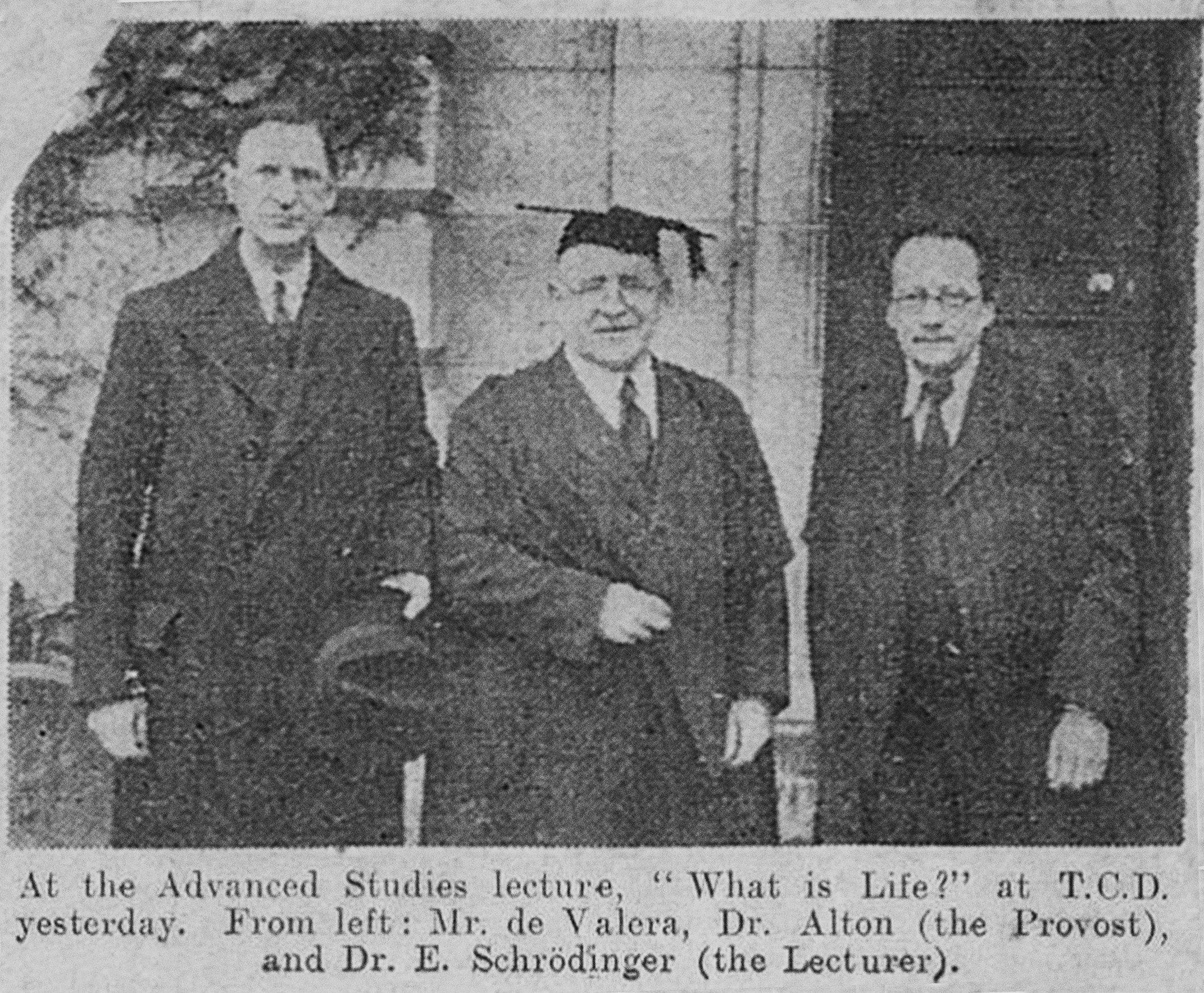
Schrödinger with Éamon de Valera and Ernest Alton outside the Fitzgerald building in TCD before the first What is Life? lecture.

Schrödinger’s stated objective was to address the question: “How can the events in space and time which take place within the spatial boundary of a living organism be accounted for by physics and chemistry?” The subject matter was acknowledged in advance as difficult and not a popular science lecture in the usual sense. Schrödinger explored how physical concepts might underlie the stability of hereditary structures, mutation, and the organisation of living cells. He introduced the concept of the “aperiodic crystal” to describe the proposed hereditary material. He also argued that living systems are consistent with the laws of thermodynamics and compensate for the reduction in entropy associated with their growth by feeding on “negative entropy” from their environment. While the molecular mechanism of heredity in the form of DNA had not yet been discovered, in 1935 Nikolay Timofeev-Ressovsky, Karl Zimmer, and Max Delbrück had presented the first experimental evidence of a molecular basis of heredity at the Kaiser Wilhelm Institute for Chemistry in Berlin. Schrödinger knew Delbrück from his time in Berlin and was deeply intrigued by his experimental work; his speculations in Dublin brought attention to Delbrück's work and helped stimulate further inquiry.

What is Life? has been widely credited with influencing the young molecular biologists James D. Watson and Francis Crick, both of whom acknowledged his work as formative in their discovery of the DNA double helix in 1953. The Dublin Institute for Advanced Studies holds a 1953 letter from Crick to Schrödinger noting that he and Watson had been influenced by the book.

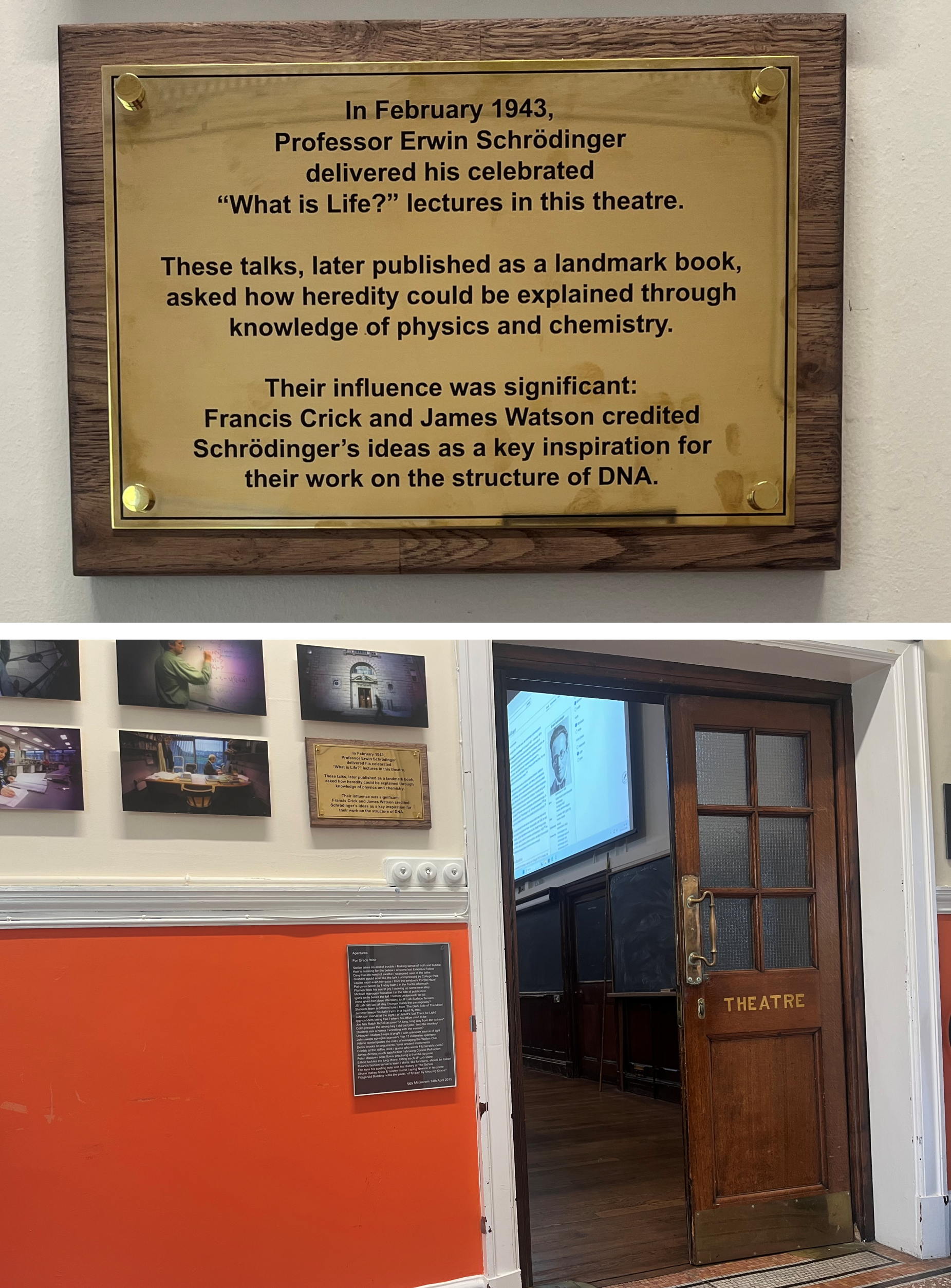

The lectures have been described as “the most important and exciting thing to happen in Trinity in all of the six dark years of wartime.” Time reported that Schrödinger's February 1943 lecture series at Trinity College Dublin drew a capacity crowd, and was attended by scholars, diplomats, cabinet ministers, and socialites.

Beginning in 1995 and continuing to this day, Trinity College has commemorated the original 1943 lecture series with an annual “What is Life?” lecture, usually delivered in the Physics Lecture Theatre. In 2018, Trinity also organised the 75th-anniversary conference “Schrödinger at 75: The Future of Biology”. The Trinity Library also produced an exhibition celebrating Schrödinger’s Dublin years and the impact of the lectures.

== Background ==
Max Delbrück's thinking about the physical basis of life was an important influence on Schrödinger. However, long before the publication of What is Life?, the American geneticist Hermann J. Muller, who would later win a Nobel Prize in 1946, had in his 1922 article "Variation due to Change in the Individual Gene" already laid out all the basic properties of the "heredity molecule" (not yet known to be DNA) which Schrödinger re-derived in 1944 "from first principles" in What is Life? (including the "aperiodicity" of the molecule), properties which Muller specified and refined additionally in his 1929 article "The Gene As The Basis of Life" and during the 1930s. Muller himself wrote in a 1960 letter to a journalist regarding What Is Life? that whatever the book got right about the "hereditary molecule" had already been published before 1944 and that Schrödinger's were only the wrong speculations; Muller also named two famous geneticists, including Delbrück, who knew every relevant pre-1944 publication and had been in contact with Schrödinger before 1944. DNA as the molecule of heredity became foremost only after Oswald Avery's bacterial-transformation experiments published in 1944; before those experiments, proteins were considered the most likely candidates. DNA was confirmed as the molecule in question by the Hershey–Chase experiment conducted in 1952.

== Content of What is Life? book ==
In Chapter I, Schrödinger explains that most physical laws on a large scale are due to chaos on a small scale. He calls this principle "order-from-disorder". As an example he mentions diffusion, which can be modeled as a highly ordered process, but which is nevertheless caused by random movement of atoms or molecules. As the number of atoms is reduced, the behaviour of a system becomes increasingly random. He states that life greatly depends on order and that a naïve physicist may assume that the master code of a living organism has to consist of a large number of atoms.

In Chapter II and III, he summarizes what was known at the time about the hereditary mechanism. Most importantly, he elaborates on the role mutations play in biological evolution. He concludes that the carrier of hereditary information has to be both small in size and permanent in time, contradicting the naïve physicist's expectation. This contradiction cannot be resolved by classical physics.

In Chapter IV, Schrödinger presents molecules, which are indeed stable even if they consist of only a few atoms, as the solution. Even though molecules had long been known to exist, their stability could not be explained by classical physics due to the discrete nature of quantum mechanics. Furthermore, mutations are directly linked to quantum leaps.

He continues to explain, in chapter V, that true solids, which are also permanent, are composed of highly ordered crystals. The stability of molecules and crystals is due to the same principles, and a molecule might be called "the germ of a solid". On the other hand, an amorphous solid, without crystalline structure, should be regarded as a liquid with a very high viscosity. Schrödinger writes that the heredity material is likely to be a molecule, which unlike a crystal does not repeat itself. He calls this an "aperiodic crystal". Its aperiodic nature allows it to encode an almost infinite number of possibilities with a small number of atoms. He finally compares this picture with the known facts and finds it in accordance with them.

In Chapter VI, Schrödinger states:

...living matter, while not eluding the "laws of physics" as established up to date, is likely to involve "other laws of physics" hitherto unknown, which however, once they have been revealed, will form just as integral a part of science as the former.

He anticipates that this statement will be open to misconception and tries to clarify it. The main principle involved with "order-from-disorder" is the second law of thermodynamics, according to which entropy only increases in a closed system (such as the universe). Schrödinger explains that living matter evades the decay to thermodynamical equilibrium by homeostatically maintaining negative entropy in an open system.

In Chapter VII, he maintains that "order-from-order" is not absolutely new to physics; in fact, it is even simpler and more plausible. But nature follows "order-from-disorder", with such exceptions as the predictable movement of the celestial bodies and the behaviour of mechanical devices such as clocks. Even those are influenced by thermal and frictional forces. The degree to which a system functions mechanically or randomly depends on the temperature. If sufficiently heated, a clock melts into a puddle of randomly moving molecules. Conversely, if the temperature approaches absolute zero, any system behaves more and more mechanically. Some systems, such as clocks, approach this mechanical behaviour even at room temperature.

Schrödinger concludes this chapter and the book with philosophical speculations on determinism, free will, and the mystery of human consciousness. He attempts to "see whether we cannot draw the correct non-contradictory conclusion from the following two premises: (1) My body functions as a pure mechanism according to Laws of Nature; and (2) Yet I know, by incontrovertible direct experience, that I am directing its motions, of which I foresee the effects, that may be fateful and all-important, in which case I feel and take full responsibility for them. The only possible inference from these two facts is, I think, that I – I in the widest meaning of the word, that is to say, every conscious mind that has ever said or felt 'I' – am the person, if any, who controls the 'motion of the atoms' according to the Laws of Nature". Schrödinger then states that this insight is not new and that the Upanishads considered this insight of "ATMAN = BRAHMAN" to "represent quintessence of deepest insights into the happenings of the world." Schrödinger rejects the idea that the source of consciousness should perish with the body because he finds the idea "distasteful". He also rejects the idea that there are multiple immortal souls that can exist without the body because he believes that consciousness is nevertheless highly dependent on the body. Schrödinger writes that, to reconcile the two premises,

"The only possible alternative is simply to keep to the immediate experience that consciousness is a singular of which the plural is unknown; that there is only one thing and that what seems to be a plurality is merely a series of different aspects of this one thing…:

Any intuitions that consciousness is plural, he says, are illusions. Schrödinger is sympathetic to the Hindu concept of Brahman, by which each individual's consciousness is only a manifestation of a unitary consciousness pervading the universe — which corresponds to the Hindu concept of God. Schrödinger concludes that "...'I' am the person, if any, who controls the 'motion of the atoms' according to the Laws of Nature." However, he also qualifies the conclusion as "necessarily subjective" in its "philosophical implications". In the final paragraph, he points out that what is meant by "I" is not the collection of experienced events but "namely the canvas upon which they are collected." If a hypnotist succeeds in blotting out all earlier reminiscences, he writes, there would be no loss of personal existence — "Nor will there ever be."

== Schrödinger's "paradox" ==
In a world governed by the second law of thermodynamics, all isolated systems are expected to approach a state of maximum disorder or entropy: an irreversible state of thermodynamic equilibrium, where free energy is no longer available to do work. It has been argued that, since life approaches and maintains a highly ordered state, it violates the aforementioned second law, implying that there is a paradox. However, since the biosphere is not an isolated system, there is no paradox. The increase of order inside an organism is more than paid for by an increase in disorder outside this organism by the loss of heat into the environment. By this mechanism, the second law is obeyed, and life maintains a highly ordered state, which it sustains by causing a net increase in disorder in the Universe. In order to increase the complexity on Earth—as life does—free energy is needed, and in this case is provided by the Sun.

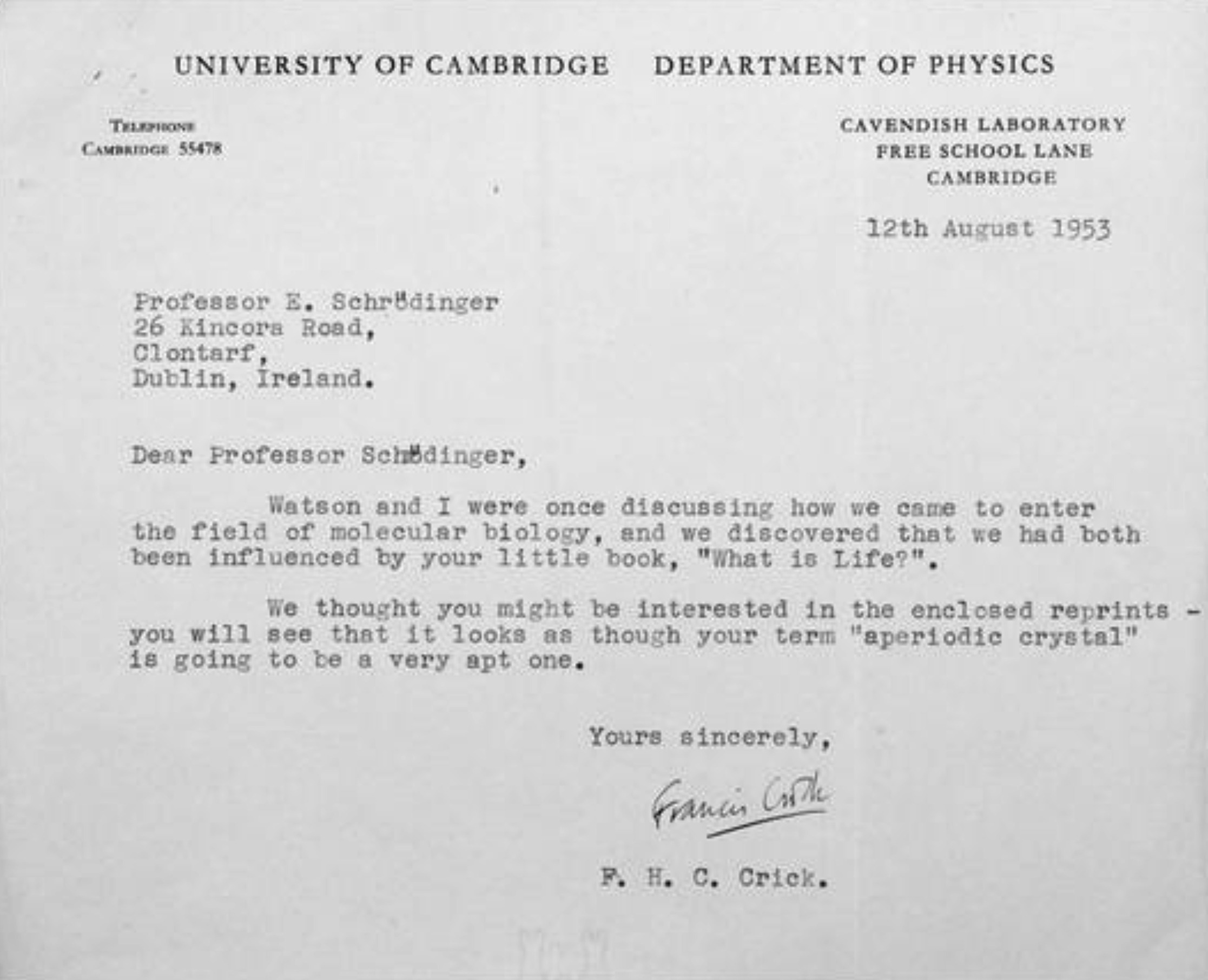
Letter from Francis Crick to Schrodinger.

== Legacy ==
Schrödinger’s What is Life? (based on his 1943 Dublin lectures) helped ignite molecular biology by framing heredity as a physical problem and popularizing the idea of an “aperiodic crystal,” effectively anticipating a genetic code. It drew physicists into biology; Sarkar notes its influence on founders such as Watson, Crick, Benzer, and Wilkins, even if some said they’d have come into the field anyway. Yet posterity criticized Schrödinger’s dated biology and his speculation about “new laws” and “negative entropy.” Sarkar argues those criticisms are often unfair for their time, and that the book’s lasting legacy is conceptual inspiration more than technical accuracy. Crick’s later letter to Schrödinger—now held by D.I.A.S.—captures this dual legacy: gratitude for inspiration and confirmation that “aperiodic crystal” proved apt.

== Editions ==
- Erwin Schrödinger (1944), What Is Life? and Other Scientific Essays. Based on lectures delivered under the auspices of the Dublin Institute for Advanced Studies at Trinity College, Dublin, in February 1943. Doubleday (1956) and Internet Archive.

== See also ==
- Entropy and life
- Gibbs free energy
- James D. Watson
- Philosophy of biology
- Quantum Aspects of Life
