= Yoni Freedhoff =

Canadian doctor

Yoni Freedhoff is an associate professor of family medicine at the University of Ottawa. He is also a founder and medical director of the Bariatric Medical Institute, a for-profit, non-surgical weight management clinic.

== Education and career ==
Freedhoff attended the University of Toronto. He was a guest blogger at the Huffington Post in 2011–12. In 2012, the Ontario Medical Association invited Freedhoff to give a talk on nutrition policy before food industry executives at an event organized by the public relations firm Fleishman-Hillard. Fleishman-Hillard then informed him that he would not be on the program. In 2013, Freedhoff criticized Health Check, a nutritional certification program operated by the Heart and Stroke Foundation of Canada, for having endorsed products with high sodium and/or sugar contents.

=== The Diet Fix ===
His first book, The Diet Fix: Why Diets Fail and How to Make Yours Work, was published in 2014. A review by Newsday described the book's concept of "post-traumatic dieting disorder", which includes feelings like guilt and depression that may occur after failed dieting attempts. A Scientific American review said that Freedhoff touches on the "toxic, obesogenic environment" of the modern world, but it lamented the fact that Freedhoff does not go into more detail on that aspect of the dieting problem.

=== 2023 comments ===
In November 2023, Freedhoff alleged in a blog post that social media posts referencing the "Free Palestine" movement by Dr. Yipeng Ge, a medical resident at the University of Ottawa, were antisemitic. The University suspended Ge, and a subsequent petition demanding Ge's reinstatement and an investigation by the university was signed by more than 100,000 people. As of January 20, 2024, Dr. Ge had been reinstated without an apology.

== Personal life ==
Freedhoff is the son of theoretical physicist Helen Freedhoff and chartered accountant Stephen Freedhoff. His sister, Michal Ilana Freedhoff, is the Assistant Administrator of the EPA's Office of Chemical Safety and Pollution Prevention.
