= César-Mansuète Despretz =

French chemist and physicist

- Born: 4 May 1791; Lessines, France
- Died: 15 May 1863 (aged 72); Paris, France
- Scientific career
- Fields: Chemistry, physics
- Thesis: Sur le maximum de la densité de l'eau (1832)

César-Mansuète Despretz (4 May 1791, Lessines – 15 March 1863, Paris) was a chemist and physicist. He became a French citizen in 1838. A street got its name after him in Lessines (rue César Despretz).

== Biography ==
In 1818, Despretz started working as répétiteur in chemistry at Polytechnique, in Paris, under Joseph Louis Gay-Lussac (1778-1850) who mentored his early research.

In 1824, he was appointed to teach at the prestigious Lycée Henri-IV, first as adjunct professor, then as holder of the chair of physics. In 1831, César Despretz was briefly appointed to the chair of physics at Polytechnique to replace Claude Pouillet (1791-1868) who had resigned for health reasons after only a few months in office. Despretz was succeeded by Gabriel Lamé (1795-1870) who would hold the position from 1832 to 1844.

In 1837, he was appointed adjunct professor of physics at the Faculté des sciences de Paris. In 1841, Despretz succeeded Félix Savart (1791-1841) in the physics section of the French Academy of Sciences. He would serve as president in 1858. In 1847, he became full professor of physics at the Faculté des sciences de Paris.

César Despretz became a foreign member of the Royal Society in 1862, a few months before his death at the age of 71.
