= Arthur Schlossmann =

German pediatrician (1867-1932)

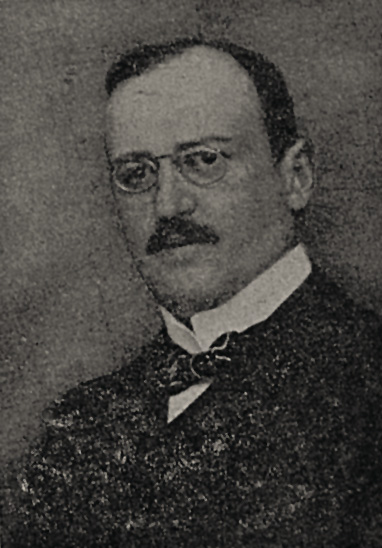
- Schlossmann in 1907
- Born: December 16, 1867; Breslau, Austria-Hungary
- Died: June 5, 1932 (aged 64); Düsseldorf, Germany

Academic background
- Education: Ludwig-Maximilians-Universität München

Arthur Schlossmann (16 December 1867 – 5 June 1932, in Düsseldorf) was a German pediatrician and social public health specialist.

== Life and career ==
Born in Breslau, Schlossmann attended the Kreuzschule in Dresden from 1874 to 1886. He obtained his doctorate from the Ludwig-Maximilians-Universität München in 1891 after completing his medical studies at several German universities. As a young man he worked as an assistant at Adolf Aron Baginsky's Kaiser-und-Kaiserin-Kinderkrankenhaus in Berlin.

In 1897 in Dresden, he founded a private Säuglingsheim (home for babies), a hospital devoted entirely for in-patient treatment of sick infants. This institution was considered to be the first of its kind anywhere. Here, Schlossmann worked at improving care for infants, that included an environment adhering to strict asepsis, systematic training of pediatric nurses and testing that involved his personal ideas on natural diet.

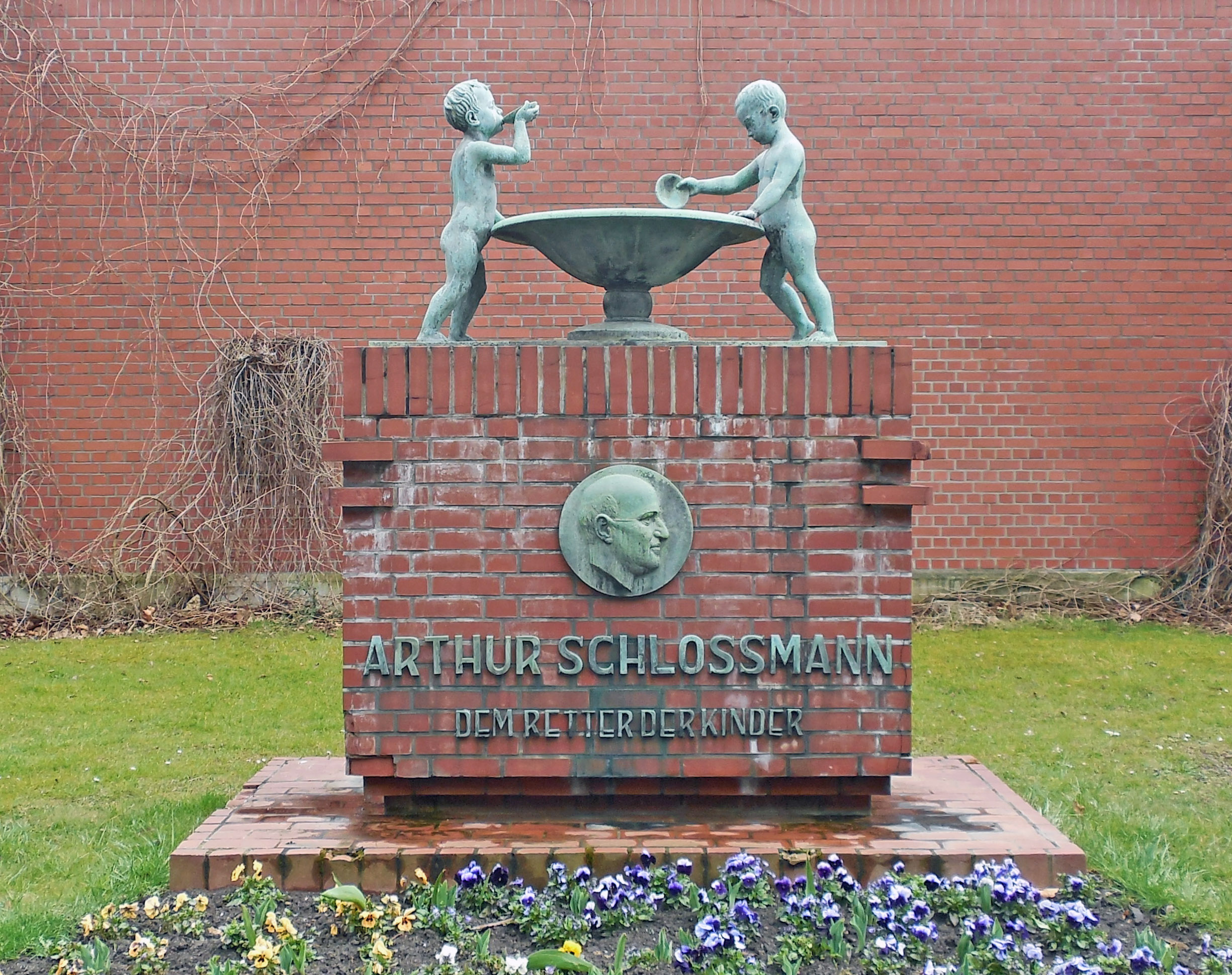
Memorial to Schlossmann at the University Hospital of Dusseldorf. Inscription: Dem Retter der Kinder ("To the savior of children").

In 1898, he received his habilitation at the Institute for Physiological Chemistry (Institut für Physiologische Chemie) of the Technische Hochschule at Dresden. Beginning in 1906, he worked in Düsseldorf, initially as director of the children's ward at the municipal hospital. In 1923, he attained the title of professor of pediatrics in Düsseldorf. In 1926, Schlossmann was elected member of the German National Academy of Sciences Leopoldina.

== Selected writings ==
- Handbuch der Kinderheilkunde (five volumes, 1906) with Meinhard von Pfaundler (1872-1947), this work was later translated into English as "The Diseases of children; a work for the practising physician".
- Handbuch der sozialen Hygiene und Gesundheitsfürsorge (six volumes, 1925–27) with Adolf Gottstein (1857–1941) and Ludwig Teleky (1872–1957).
