= Health Check =

Food certification program in Canada

Health Check was a certification program operated by the Heart and Stroke Foundation of Canada. First established in 1999, the program allowed food products that met predetermined nutritional guidelines to be marketed using a Health Check seal, identifying the product as being endorsed by the Heart and Stroke Foundation. Distributors and restaurants were required to pay a fee to the Heart and Stroke Foundation to license the logo.

The Health Check program was discontinued in 2014; the program had been criticized by University of Ottawa professor Yoni Freedhoff for endorsing products with high sugar and sodium contents as purportedly being healthy options.

== Criteria ==
Products that qualify for a Health Check symbol must meet category-specific nutrient criteria: The amount of nutrients required is determined from the Canada Food Guide.

- total fat
- saturated fat
- trans fat
- fibre
- sodium
- sugar
- protein
- vitamins and minerals

More specifically the criteria are based on nutrients Canadians should incorporate into their diet such as fibre and vitamins, and also those they should eat less of such as sodium, fat and sugar. The grocery items are divided into categories related to the Canadian Food Guide food groups which include: Vegetable and Fruit, Grain Products, Milk and Alternatives, Meat and Alternatives plus Oil and Fat. There is also a category for food that incorporate more than one of these called Combination Foods.

The Health Check website has a list of criteria for the products, some examples include:

Vegetable and Fruit

Fruit juice must be:

- made from 100% fruit juice with no added sugar
- an excellent source of vitamin C (50%) or vitamin A (25%) or folate (25%) or source of fibre (2 grams)

Frozen and Canned Vegetables, both seasoned and sauced, must have

- no more than 240 milligrams of sodium
- no more than three grams of fat

Grain Products

Breakfast cereal must have:

- no more than three grams of fat
- at least two grams of fibre
- no more than 240 milligrams of sodium
- no more than six grams of sugar (excluding sugars from pieces of fruit) except if four grams or more of fibre
- no more than five percent of total fat from trans fat

Milk and Alternatives

Yogurt must have:

- no more than two percent milk fat
- at least fifteen percent of the daily recommended calcium
- no more than 140 milligrams of sodium
- no added sugar

Meat and Alternatives

Plain meat or poultry must have:

- no more than ten percent fat
- no added salt or sodium
- no more than five percent of fat from trans fat

An independent company randomly evaluates the items, on an annual basis, to ensure that products indeed meet the criteria.

== Criticism ==
The Health Check program was criticized for giving misleading endorsements to unhealthy products. Obesity expert and University of Ottawa assistant professor Dr. Yoni Freedhoff was a notable critic of the program, having criticized it for endorsing products with high sugar and sodium contents. In 2012, he criticized the program's endorsement of products from Canadian fast food burger chain Harvey's with the seal. While endorsed for protein and vegetable contents and use of multi-grain buns, Freedhoff pointed out that the endorsed grilled veggie and grilled chicken burgers respectively contained 930 and 950 mg of sodium, "virtually half of recommended daily intake." The following year, he criticized the program for endorsing Sun-Rype's Fruitsource Fruit Bites product despite its high sugar content. He argued that "abusing the public's trust to sell candy to kids under the guise of fruit is not what the Heart and Stroke Foundation is supposed to be doing".

These issues were a factor in the discontinuation of the program in 2014. Program director Terry Dean felt that the Health Check model had become outdated and "just didn’t allow us to have the footprint that we needed". He stated that the Heart and Stroke Foundation would shift its focus towards "broader" advocacy at the corporate and government levels.
