= Adolf Gottstein =

German social hygienist and epidemiologist

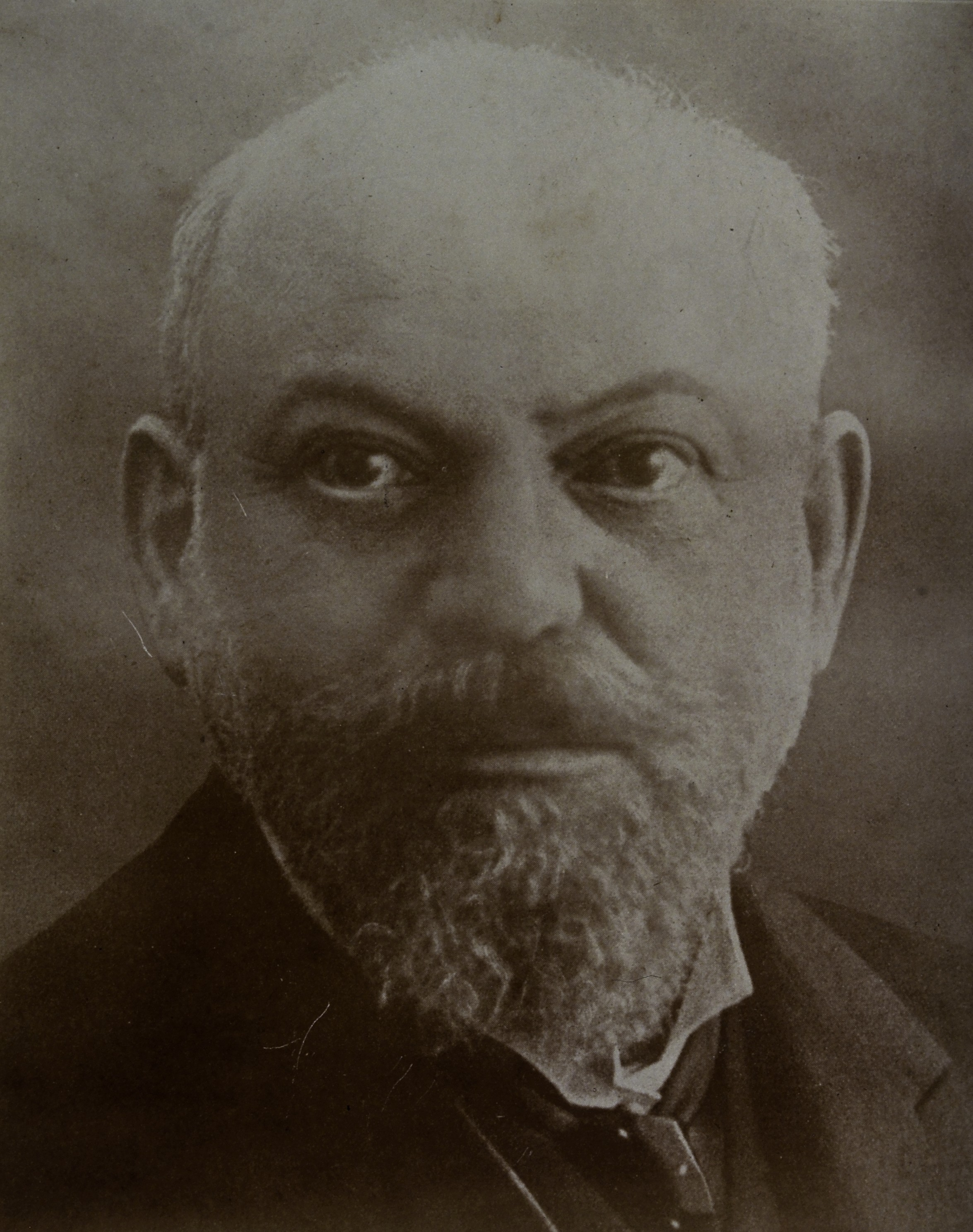
Adolf Gottstein

Adolf Gottstein (2 November 1857 in Breslau – 3 March 1941) was a German social hygienist and epidemiologist.

He studied in medicine at the universities of Breslau, Strasbourg and Leipzig, obtaining his doctorate with a dissertation on marasmic thrombosis. In 1886, he relocated to Berlin, where he worked at a private medical practice until 1911, spending his free time performing research in the laboratories of pathologist Carl Friedländer (1847–1887), pharmacologist Oskar Liebreich (1839–1908) and bacteriologist Robert Koch (1843–1910). Gottstein was deeply interested in epidemiological and statistical studies, as well as social hygiene issues from a medical standpoint.

In 1906 he became a municipal councillor in Berlin-Charlottenburg, followed by an appointment as Stadtmedizinalrat (1911). In 1914 he was Geheimer Sanitätsrat (privy medical councillor), and from 1919 to 1924 served as ministerial director. In this capacity he took a progressive stance in regards to public health, being associated with initiatives that included establishment of the Landesgesundheitsrates (Prussian State Health Council), the Krüppelfürsorgegesetz (welfare act involving the crippled) and the creation of three academies of social hygiene.

== Selected writings ==
- Epidemiologische Studien uber Diphtherie und Scharlach (Epidemiological studies on diphtheria and scarlet fever, 1895
- Allgemeine Epidemiologie (General epidemiology), 1897
- Die Periodizita¨t der Diphtherie und ihre Ursachen. Epidemiologische Untersuchung, 1903
- Die Lehre von den Epidemien (The doctrine of epidemics), 1925
- Handbuch der sozialen Hygiene und Gesundheitsfürsorge, with Arthur Schlossmann (1867–1932) and Ludwig Teleky (1872–1957), 1925-27
- Allgemeine Epidemiologie der Tuberkulose (General epidemiology of tuberculosis), 1931.
