= Theodor Escherich =

Austrian doctor

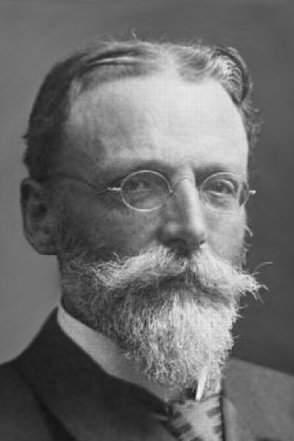
- Theodor Escherich, around 1900
- Born: 29 November 1857; Ansbach, Kingdom of Bavaria
- Died: 15 February 1911 (aged 53); Vienna, Austria-Hungary
- Citizenship: Kingdom of Bavaria; Austria-Hungary
- Education: University of Würzburg; Kiel University; Friedrich Wilhelm University of Berlin
- Known for: Discovery of Escherichia coli
- Spouse: Margaretha Pfaundler
- Awards: k. k. Hofrat (1906)
- Scientific career
- Fields: Medicine, pediatrics, bacteriology
- Workplaces: Julius Hospital, Würzburg; St. Anna Children's Hospital, Vienna; Children’s Polyclinic of the Reisingerianum, Munich; Hauner Children’s Hospital, Munich; Ludwig-Maximilians-Universität München; University of Graz
- Doctoral advisor: Carl Jakob Adolf Christian Gerhardt

Theodor Escherich (German pronunciation: [ˈteːodoːɐ̯ ˈʔɛʃəʁɪç]; 29 November 1857 – 15 February 1911) was a German-Austrian pediatrician and a professor at the University of Graz and the University of Vienna. He discovered and described the bacterium Escherichia coli.

== Life and achievements ==
=== Family and education ===
Theodor Escherich was born in Ansbach, as the younger son of Kreismedizinalrat (District Medical Officer) Ferdinand Escherich (1810−1888), a medical statistician, and his second wife, Maria Sophie Frederike von Stromer, daughter of a Bavarian army colonel. When Theodor Escherich was five, his mother died, and five years later Ferdinand Escherich moved to Würzburg to take up his former position as Kreismedizinalrat and married his third wife. When Theodor was 12, he was sent to a boarding school run by Jesuits in Feldkirch, Austria for three years. Later, he finished secondary education in Würzburg, where he attended a Gymnasium (classical language high school) and took his Abitur examination in 1876.

After a half-year military service in Strasbourg, Escherich took up his studies of medicine at the University of Würzburg in the winter term of 1876. Later, he attended Kiel University and the Friedrich Wilhelm University of Berlin, and returned to Würzburg before passing his medical examination with excellence in December 1881.

=== Medical career in Würzburg and Munich (1882−1890) ===
After an 18-month service in a military hospital in Munich, Escherich returned to Würzburg in 1882 to become second and later first assistant to the internist Carl Jakob Adolf Christian Gerhardt in the medical clinic of the Julius Hospital, Würzburg. Gerhardt became Escherich's doctoral advisor and suggested the topic of his thesis. On 27 October 1882, Escherich was awarded his medical doctorate. In the following two years, he attended lectures in Vienna (with Hermann von Widerhofer and Alois Monti) and did bacteriological research work at the St Anna Children's Clinic. In August 1884, he continued his research work in Munich, where pediatrics had been established as a department of the medical faculty. In October 1884, the Bavarian authorities sent Escherich to Naples to do research work in the actual cholera epidemic. He also travelled to Paris, where he heard lectures by Jean-Martin Charcot, the renowned neurologist.

=== Discovery of Escherichia coli ===
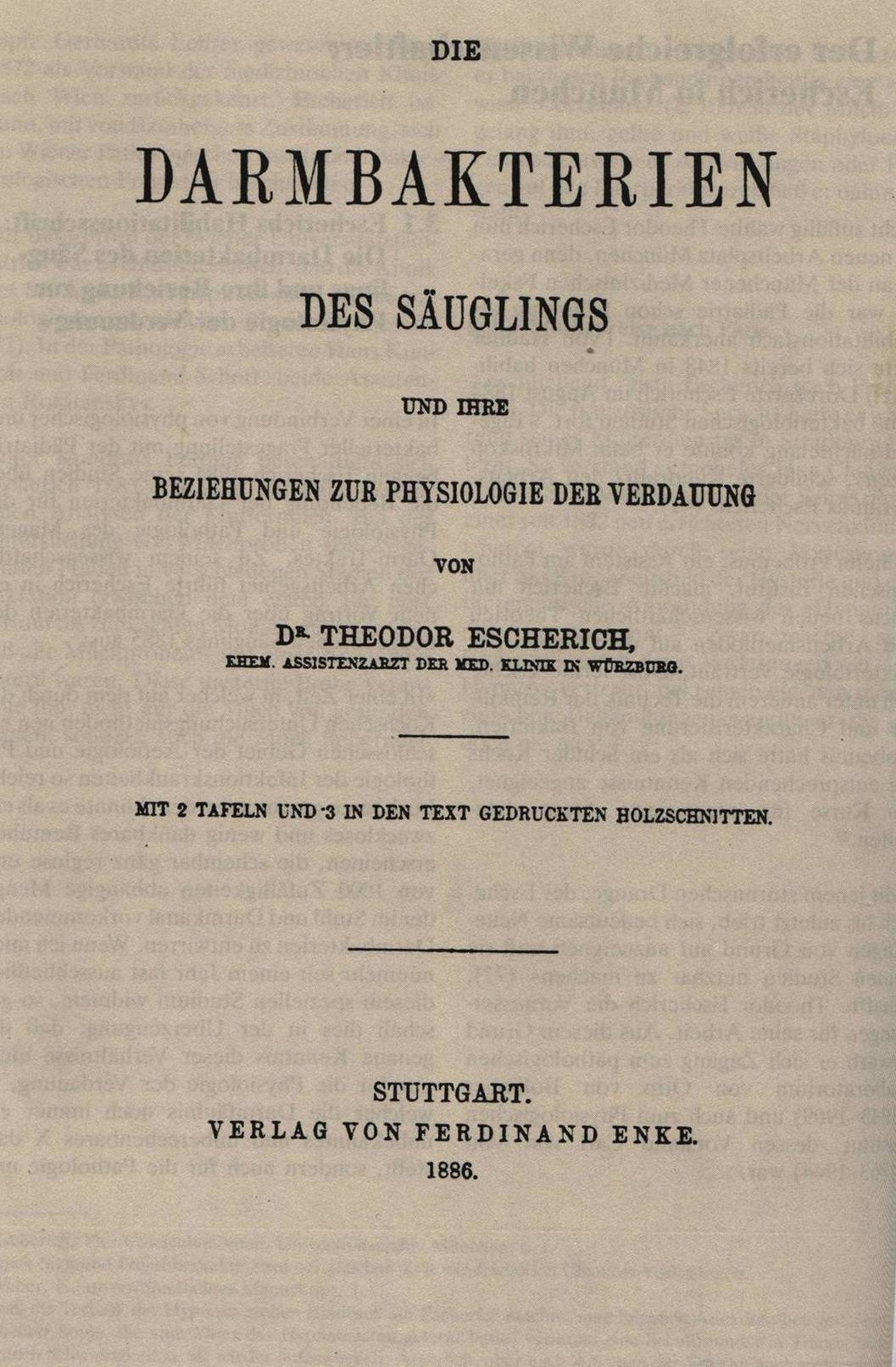
Escherich's habilitation treatise

In 1886, after intensive laboratory investigations, Escherich published a monograph on the relationship of intestinal bacteria to the physiology of digestion in the infant. This work, presented to the medical faculty in Munich and published in Stuttgart, Die Darmbakterien des Säuglings und ihre Beziehungen zur Physiologie der Verdauung (1886) (Enterobacteria of infants and their relation to digestion physiology), was to become his habilitation treatise and established him as the leading bacteriologist in the field of pediatrics. It was also the publication where Escherich described a bacterium which he called “bacterium coli commune” and which was later to be called Escherichia coli. For the next four years, Escherich worked as first assistant to Heinrich von Ranke at the Munich Von Haunersche Kinderklinik.

=== Professor of pediatrics in Graz and Vienna (1890−1911) ===
In 1890, Escherich succeeded Rudolf von Jaksch, who had been called to Prague, as professor extraordinary of pediatrics and director of the St Anna children’s clinic in Graz, where he became professor ordinary four years later. While working in Graz, he married Margarethe Pfaundler (1890−1946), daughter of the physicist Leopold Pfaundler. They had a son Leopold (born 1893), who died at age ten, and a daughter Charlotte (called "Sonny") (born 1895), who survived to the 1980s.
Escherich made the Graz pediatric hospital one of the best-known institutions in Europe.

In 1902, Escherich succeeded Hermann Widerhofer as full professor of pediatrics in Vienna, where he directed the St.-Anna-Kinderspital (St. Anna Children's Hospital).

Escherich became renowned in 1903 when he founded the Säuglingsschutz (Infant Defence Society) and started a high-profile campaign for breastfeeding. He died in Vienna in 1911.

== Honors ==
- 1894 — Honorary member of the Moscow Pediatric Society
- 1905 — Honorary member of the American Pediatric Society
- 1905 — Member of the Academy of Science, St. Louis
- 1906 — Awarded title of kaiserlich-königlicher Hofrat (Official Imperial and Royal Privy Councillor)
- 1906 — Member of the Medical Academy in Rome
- 1909 — Honorary member of the Belgian Liga de la Protection de la Première Enfance
