= Pusey–Barrett–Rudolph theorem =

Theorem pertaining to the ontology of quantum mechanics

The Pusey–Barrett–Rudolph (PBR) theorem is a no-go theorem in quantum foundations due to Matthew Pusey, Jonathan Barrett, and Terry Rudolph (for whom the theorem is named) in 2012. It has particular significance for how one may interpret the nature of the quantum state.

With respect to certain realist hidden variable theories that attempt to explain the predictions of quantum mechanics, the theorem rules that pure quantum states must be "ontic" in the sense that they correspond directly to states of reality, rather than "epistemic" in the sense that they represent probabilistic or incomplete states of knowledge about reality.

The PBR theorem may also be compared with other no-go theorems like Bell's theorem and the Bell–Kochen–Specker theorem, which, respectively, rule out the possibility of explaining the predictions of quantum mechanics with local hidden variable theories and noncontextual hidden variable theories. Similarly, the PBR theorem could be said to rule out preparation independent hidden variable theories, in which quantum states that are prepared independently have independent hidden variable descriptions.

== Theorem ==
This theorem concerns the interpretational status of pure quantum states. Under the classification of hidden variable models of Nicholas Harrigan and Robert Spekkens, the interpretation of the quantum wavefunction $|\psi\rangle$ can be categorized as either ψ-ontic if "every complete physical state or ontic state in the theory is consistent with only one pure quantum state" or ψ-epistemic if "there exist ontic states that are consistent with more than one pure quantum state." The PBR theorem proves that either the quantum state $|\psi\rangle$ is ψ-ontic, or else non-entangled quantum states violate the assumption of preparation independence, which would entail action at a distance.

In conclusion, we have presented a no-go theorem, which—modulo assumptions—shows that models in which the quantum state is interpreted as mere information about an objective physical state of a system cannot reproduce the predictions of quantum theory. The result is in the same spirit as Bell’s theorem, which states that no local theory can reproduce the predictions of quantum theory.

— Matthew F. Pusey, Jonathan Barrett, and Terry Rudolph

More specifically, the theorem applies to models that treat quantum states as probability distributions over hidden variables, or ontic states. In such a model, writing the space of ontic states as $\Lambda$, a quantum state $\psi$ is a probability distribution $p_\psi(\lambda)$ defined on the set $\Lambda$. An observable $A$ is represented as a set of response functions, or conditional probability densities: $A(S,\lambda)$ is the probability that the measurement $A$ has the outcome $S$ if the ontic state of the system being measured is $\lambda$. In order to reproduce the predictions of quantum mechanics, the probability of obtaining an outcome $S$ given a state $\psi$ as calculated by the Born rule must satisfy
$$P(S,\psi) = \int_\Lambda A(S,\lambda) p_\psi(\lambda) \, d\lambda.$$
The theorem concludes that if two quantum states are distinct, they must correspond to probability distributions that do not overlap.

The PBR theorem employs the concept of an "antidistinguishable" set of quantum states. A finite set of quantum states $\{\rho_i:i=1,\ldots,N\}$, written as density matrices to include the possibility of mixed states, is antidistinguishable if there exists a generalized measurement (a POVM) such that, for each value of $i$, some outcome of the POVM is assigned probability zero by the state $\rho_i$. In other words, for an antidistinguishable set of density matrices, there exists a POVM $\{E_i\}$ such that
$$\mathrm{tr}(E_i \rho_i) = 0$$
for all $i = 1,\ldots,N$. This concept was introduced by Carlton M. Caves, Christopher A. Fuchs and Rüdiger Schack under the name "post-Peierls incompatibility", as it generalizes a condition proposed by Rudolf Peierls. An antidistinguishable, or post-Peierls incompatible, set is also sometimes termed a set that allows "conclusive exclusion".

== See also ==
- Quantum foundations
- Bell's theorem
- Kochen–Specker theorem
