= Cusance =

- Commune
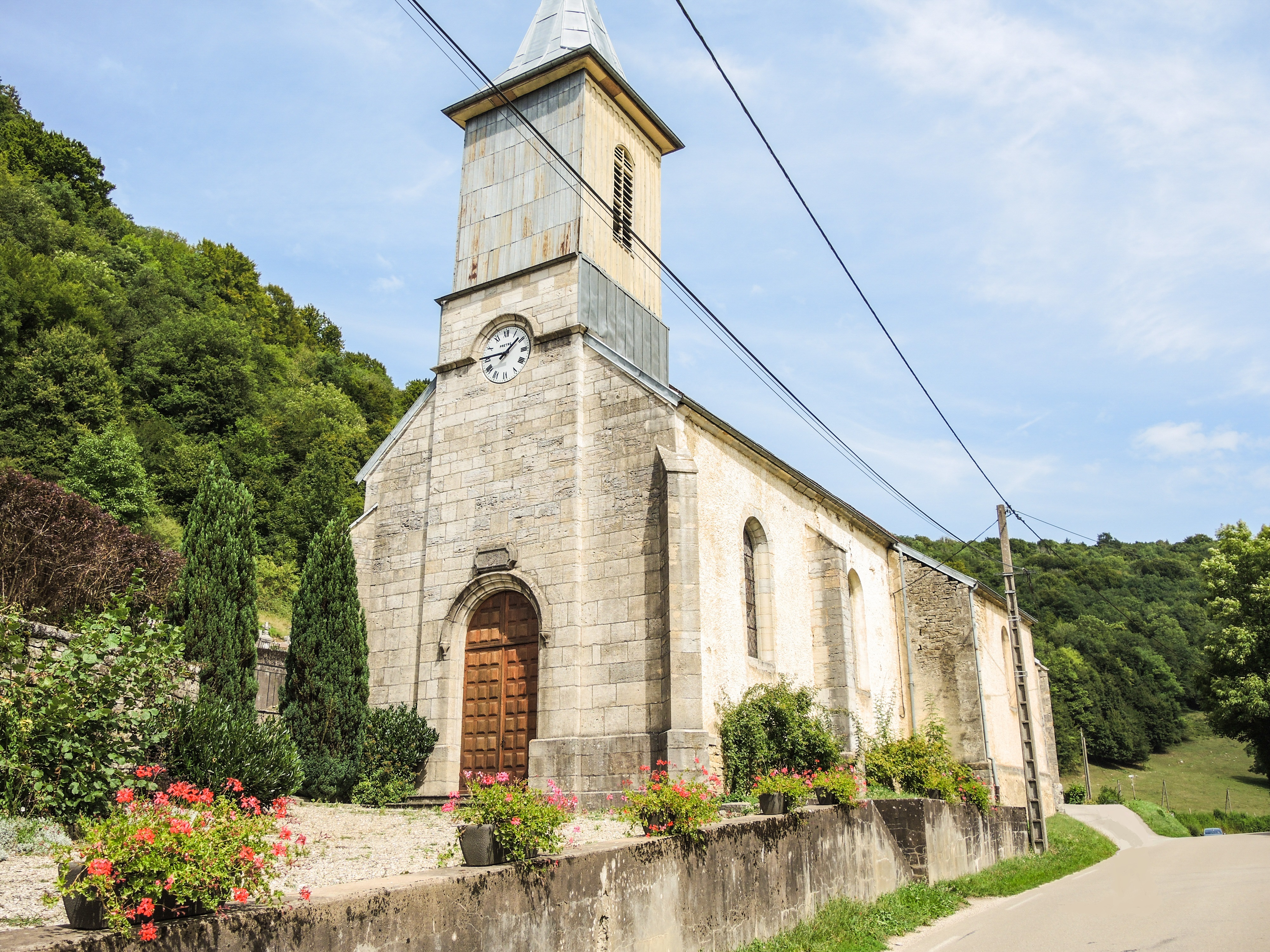
- The church in Cusance

- Coat of arms
- Location of Cusance
- Location within France Location within Bourgogne-Franche-Comté
- Coordinates: 47°19′29″N 6°26′19″E
- Country: France
- Region: Bourgogne-Franche-Comté
- Department: Doubs
- Arrondissement: Besançon
- Canton: Baume-les-Dames

Government
  - Mayor (2020–2026): Nicole Gloriod
- Area^{1}: 4.04 km^{2} (1.56 sq mi)
- Highest elevation: 490 m (1,610 ft)
- Lowest elevation: 300 m (980 ft)
- Population (2023): 76
  - Density: 19/km^{2} (49/sq mi)
- Time zone: UTC+01:00 (CET)
  - Summer (DST): UTC+02:00 (CEST)
- INSEE/Postal code: 25183 /25110
- ^{1} French Land Register data, which excludes lakes, ponds, glaciers > 1 km^{2} (0.386 sq mi or 247 acres) and river estuaries.

Cusance (French pronunciation: [kyzɑ̃s]) is a commune in the Doubs department in the Bourgogne-Franche-Comté region in eastern France. It is the birthplace of the physicist Claude Pouillet (1791-1868).

== Population ==
Historical population
Year	Pop.	±% p.a.
1968	79	—
1975	83	+0.71%
1982	69	−2.60%
1990	68	−0.18%
1999	75	+1.09%
2007	95	+3.00%
2012	81	−3.14%
2017	69	−3.16%
2023	76	+1.62%
Source: INSEE

== See also ==
- Communes of the Doubs department
