= Johann Heinrich Jakob Müller =

German physicist

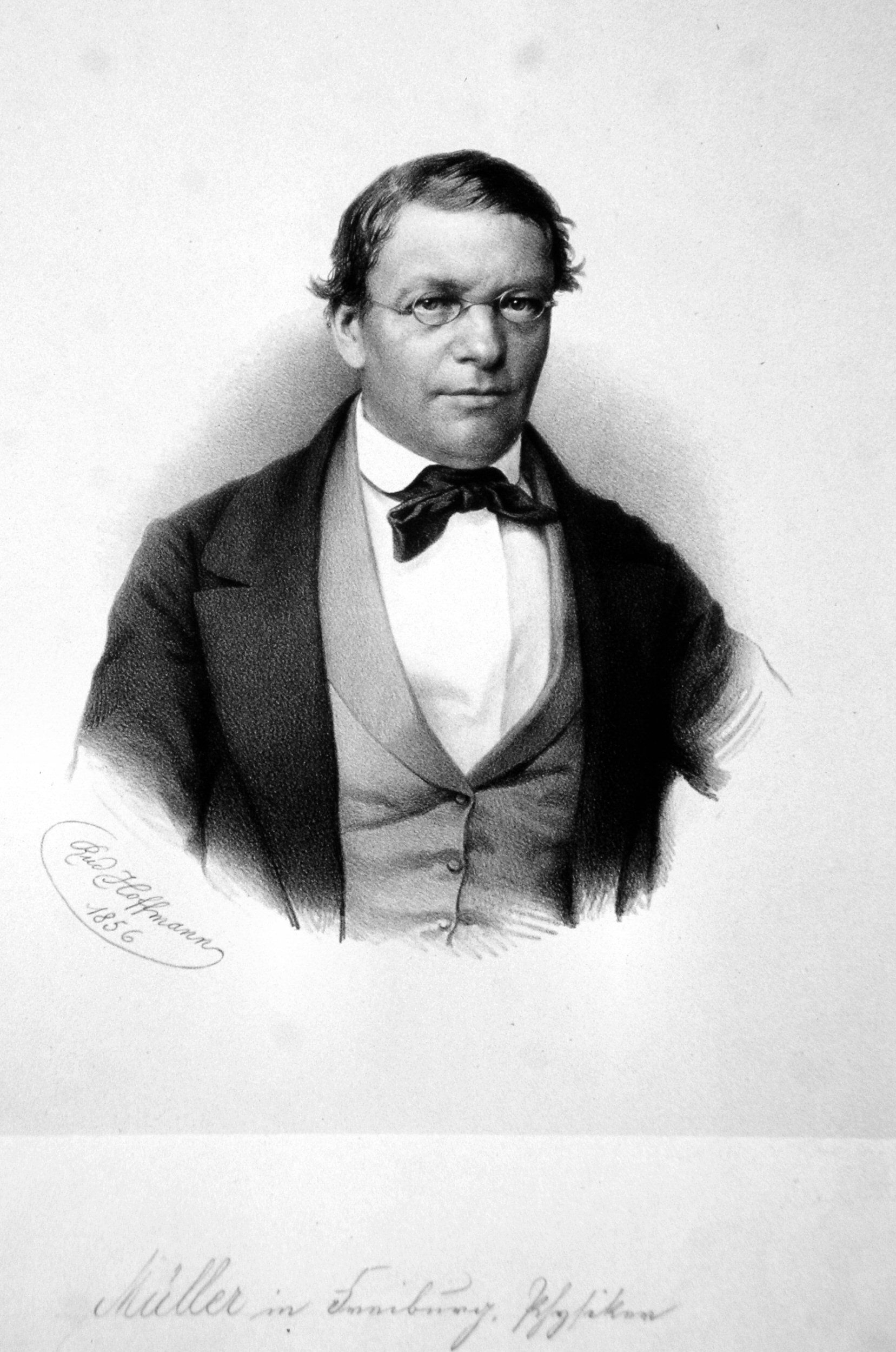
- Johann Heinrich Jacob Müller
- Born: April 30, 1809; Kassel, Kingdom of Westphalia
- Died: October 3, 1875 (aged 66); Freiburg im Breisgau, Kingdom of Westphalia
- Education: University of Giessen
- Known for: Advancements of optics, galvanism, magnetism, light and heat radiation
- Scientific career
- Fields: Physics
- Workplaces: University of Freiburg
- Academic advisors: Julius Plücker; Justus von Liebig

Johann Heinrich Jakob Müller (30 April 1809, Kassel, Kingdom of Westphalia – 3 October 1875, Freiburg im Breisgau) was a German physicist.

== Biography ==
From 1829 he studied mathematics and physics at the University of Bonn, where one of his instructors was Julius Plücker, then continued his education at the University of Giessen as a student of Justus von Liebig. In 1834 he became a teacher at the Darmstadt gymnasium, and in 1837 returned to Giessen as an instructor at the Realschule. In 1844 he was appointed professor of physics and technology at the University of Freiburg, a position he maintained up until his death in 1875.

He conducted research on optics, galvanism and magnetism, as well as studies of light and heat radiation. Beginning in 1846 he performed analysis of Fraunhofer lines.

== Works ==
His principal work, "Lehrbuch der Physik und Meteorologie" (2 volumes, Braunschweig, 1842; 7th edition, 1868–69), was originally a version of Claude Pouillet's "Éléments de physique expérimentale et de météorologie"; and he published a supplement to it, "Lehrbuch der kosmischen Physik" (1856; 3rd edition, 1872). Later on, Leopold Pfaundler published an enlarged 9th edition, titled "Müller-Pouillet's Lehrbuch der physik und meteorologie" (1886–98, 3 volumes). Among his other works are:

- Grundriss der Physik und Meteorologie (1846; 10th edition, 1869–70; with two supplements); later translated in English and published as "Principles of Physics and Meteorology" (Hippolyte Bailliere, London 1847; Lea and Blanchard, Philadelphia 1848).
- Grundzüge der Krystallographie (1845; 2nd edition, 1869).
- Anfangsgründe der geometrischen Disciplin für Gymnasien, &c. (3rd edition, 1869).
