= Claude Pouillet =

French physicist

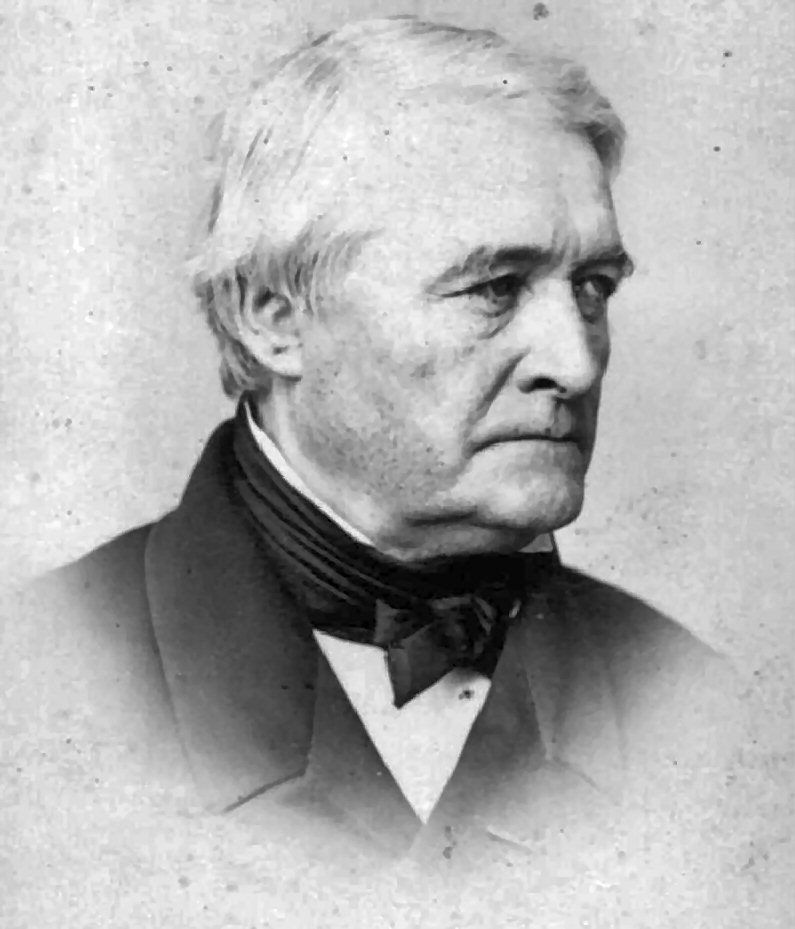
- Claude Servais Mathias Pouillet
- Born: 16 February 1790; Cusance
- Died: 14 June 1868 (aged 78); Paris
- Known for: Pouillet effect Pouillet's law

Claude Servais Mathias Pouillet (French: [klod pujɛ]; 16 February 1790 – 14 June 1868) was a French physicist and a professor of physics at the Sorbonne and member of the French Academy of Sciences (elected 1837).

== Biography ==
He studied sciences at the École normale supérieure (Paris), and from 1829 to 1849 was associated with the Conservatoire national des arts et métiers, first as a professor, and beginning in 1832, an administrator. After the death of Pierre Louis Dulong in 1838, he attained the chair of physics at the Faculty of Sciences. For a brief period of time, he was chair of physics at the École Polytechnique (1831), where he was succeeded by César Despretz in 1831 and Gabriel Lamé in 1832.

In 1852, he was compulsorily retired from the Faculty of Sciences because he refused to swear an oath of allegiance to the imperial government that took power in late 1851.

== Scientific research ==
The Pouillet effect was named after the phenomenon that he published in 1822 on the heat produced by the wetting of dry sand.

He developed a pyrheliometer and made, between 1837 and 1838, the first quantitative measurements of the solar constant. His estimate was 1228 W/m^{2}, very close to the current estimate of 1367 W/m^{2}. Using the Dulong-Petit law inappropriately, he estimated the temperature of the Sun's surface to be around 1800 °C. This value was corrected in 1879 to 5430 °C by Jožef Stefan (1835–1893).

He published works on optics, electricity, magnetism, meteorology, photography and photometry. In the field of optics he conducted investigations of diffraction phenomena. In his studies of electricity, he designed sine and tangent galvanometers. Pouillet developed and corrected Joseph Fourier's work on the surface temperature of the earth, developing the first real mathematical treatment of the greenhouse effect. He speculated that water vapour and carbon dioxide might trap infrared radiation in the atmosphere, warming the earth enough to support plant and animal life.

His acclaimed textbook on physics and meteorology, Éléments de physique expérimentale et de météorologie, was published in four parts. Also, it was translated into German by Johann Heinrich Jakob Müller, and published with the title, Lehrbuch der Physik und Meteorologie.

Svante Arrhenius (1896) cited a great deal of Pouillet's work.

Instruments by Pouillet
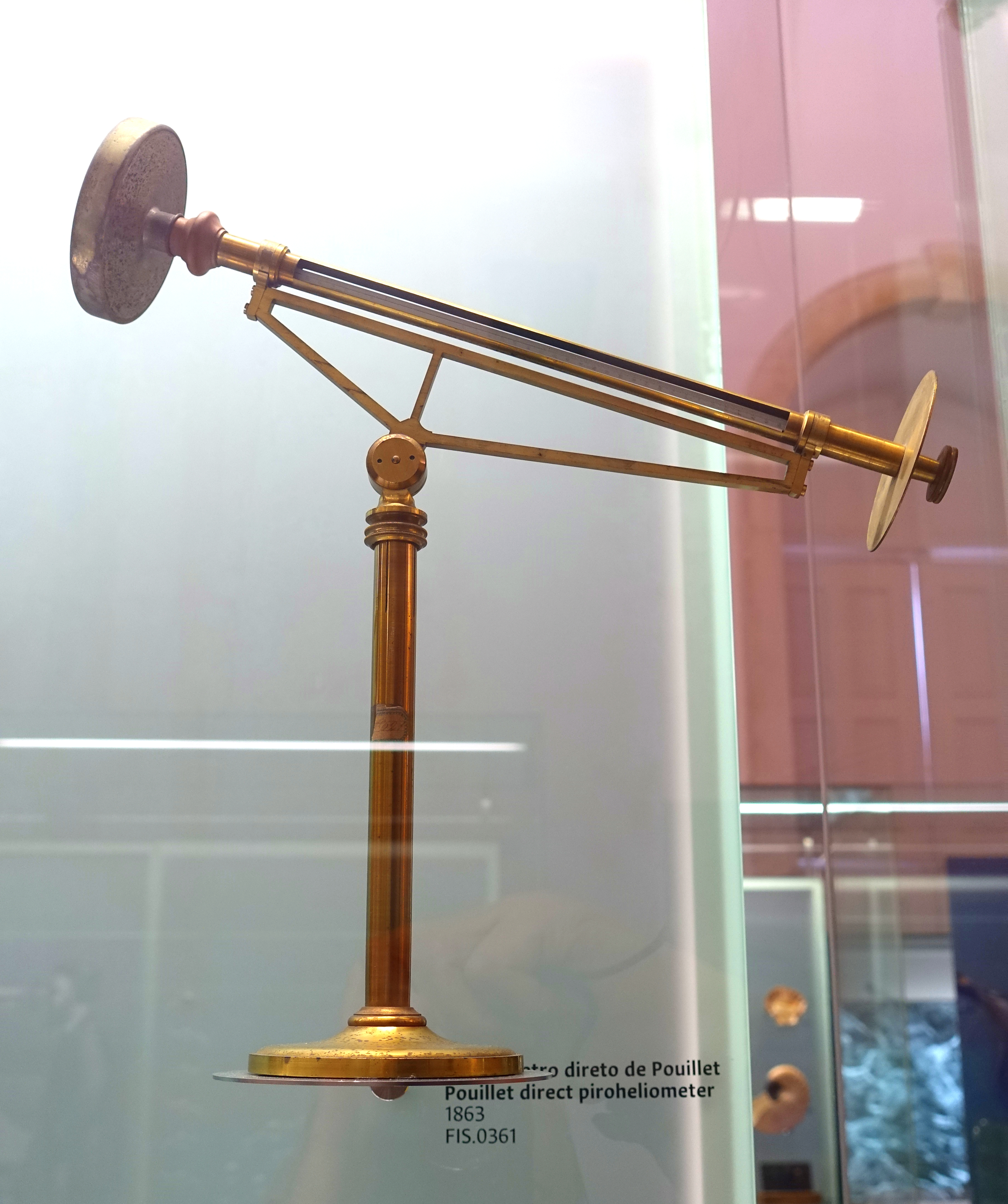
Pouillet pyrheliometer, 1863

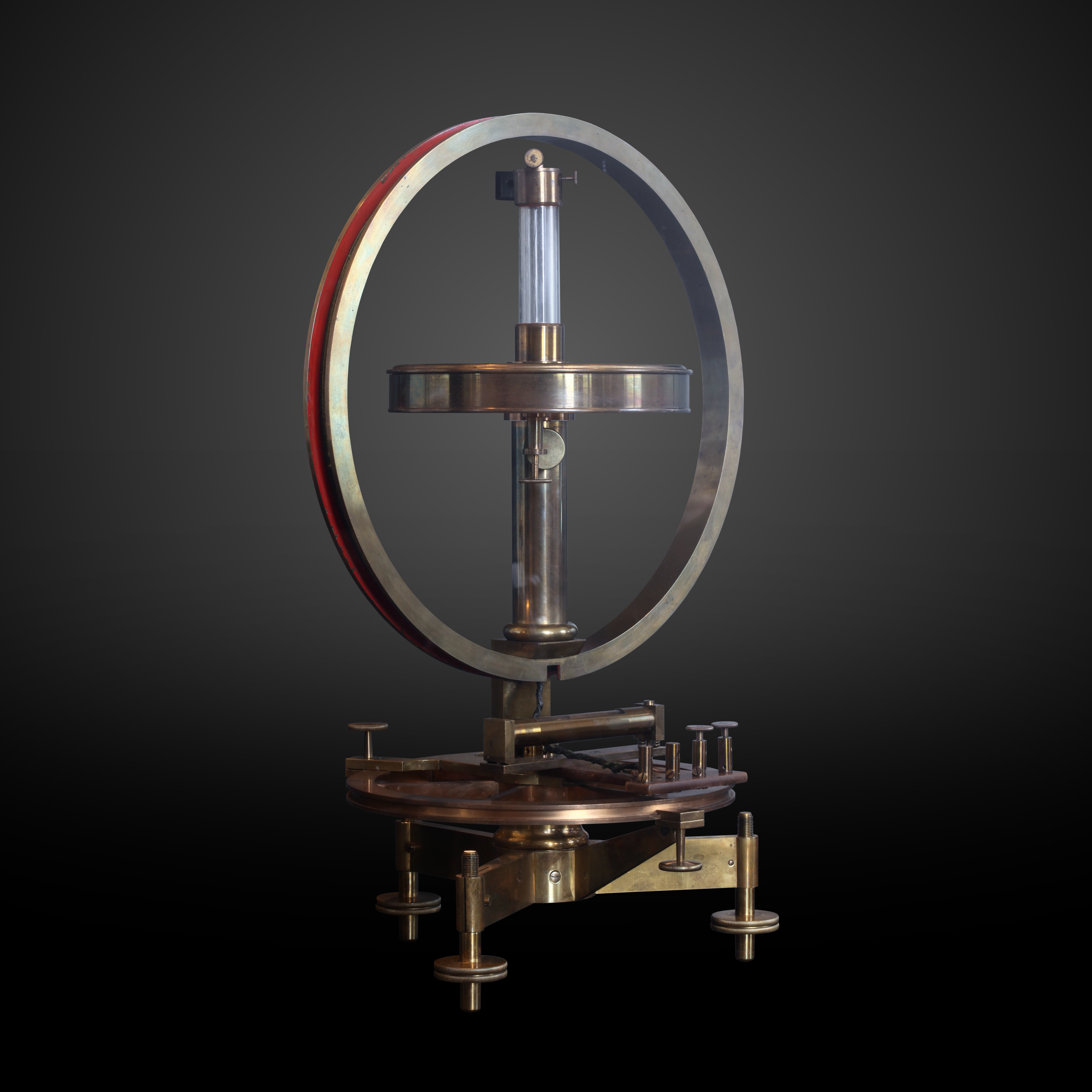
Pouillet Tangent Galvanometer on display at Musée d'histoire des sciences de la Ville de Genève

== Bibliography ==
- Mémoire sur l'électricité des fluides élastiques et sur une des causes de l'électricité de l'atmosphère (1828)
- Éléments de physique expérimentale et de météorologie (1827) ,
- Leçons de physique de la Faculté des sciences de Paris, recueillies et rédigées par M. Grosselin, (22 mars 1828 au 29 juillet 1828) Volume II: magnétisme, électricité, galvanisme, électro-magnétisme, acoustique, optique
- Mémoire sur la chaleur solaire, sur les pouvoirs rayonnants et absorbants de l'air atmosphérique et sur la température de l'espace (1838)
- Notions générales de physique et de météorologie à l'usage de la jeunesse (1850)
- Mémoire sur la densité de l'alcool; sur celle des mélanges alcooliques; sur un nouveau mode de graduation de l'aréomètre à degrés égaux (1859)
- Mémoire sur la position des pôles dans l'intérieur des barreaux aimantés et sur la mesure absolue des forces magnétiques (1859)

== See also ==
- Stefan–Boltzmann law
- Tangent galvanometer
