= Egil Hylleraas =

Norwegian physicist (1898–1985)

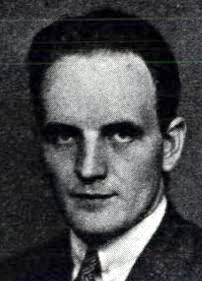
- 1934 at London
- Born: Egil Andersen Aalborg; May 15, 1898; Engerdal, Sweden–Norway
- Died: October 28, 1965 (aged 67); Oslo, Norway
- Education: University of Oslo
- Known for: Solving the helium atom
- Relatives: Olav Bø (father-in-law)
- Scientific career
- Fields: Theoretical Physics; Quantum mechanics
- Workplaces: Christian Michelson Institute, Bergen; University of Oslo
- Doctoral advisor: Lars Vegard
- Other academic advisors: Max Born

Egil Andersen Hylleraas (May 15, 1898 – October 28, 1965) was a Norwegian theoretical physicist known for creating a method for predicting the ground state energy of two-electron atoms and trial wave functions for many-electron atoms.

== Biography ==
Hylleraas was born in the town of Hylleråsen in the Engerdal Municipality of Sweden–Norway (now Norway) in 1898. Hylleraas was the youngest of ten children. His parents were teachers and farmers. The family name of Hylleraas is Aalborg, but he decided to take on the name of the farm Hylleraas.

He worked as a logger until 1916 where he attended secondary school in Oslo. In 1918, he enrolled in the University of Oslo majoring in physics and studied there until 1924. He later worked as a school teacher. He conducted research under Lars Vegard on crystallography while at Oslo.

Hylleraas's work on crystallography attracted the attention of Max Born, who invited him to join him at the University of Göttingen. Hylleraas worked there on quantum mechanics and on the helium atom. In 1929, he published his solution to the helium atom which matched experimental values, confirming the validity of quantum mechanics for many-electron atoms.

He married Magda Christiansen in 1926. They had a daughter Inger in 1927, who later married the folklorist Olav Bø.

In 1931, he took a position at the Christian Michelsen Institute in Bergen, and in 1937 he was offered a professor position at the University of Oslo.

Hylleraas was one of the founding fathers of CERN and represented Norway at the European Council for Nuclear Research, which later led to the organization's establishment.

He died in 1965 from a heart attack in Oslo.

== Many-electrons research ==
In his journal Reminiscences, Hylleraas referred to 1925–1930 as the Golden Age of atomic physics. It was when Bohr's theory of the atom was replaced by the new theory of quantum mechanics. By 1926, the one-electron hydrogen had been solved, and Werner Heisenberg had formulated the two-electron helium problem quantum mechanically. A simple first-order perturbation treatment still yielded considerably increased ionization potential for error with experimental measurement. Max Born considered it crucial for quantum mechanics to provide a result in better agreement with experiments.

When Hylleraas arrived at Göttingen, he learned that Max Born had abandoned crystallography. He continued Max Born's work on crystals independently. Still, he was assigned to work on the helium problem when Bohr's student became ill. Hylleraas modified the first attempt in two ways: he replaced the incomplete bound state hydrogenic functions with the complete Laguerre functions. He reduced the number of coordinates from 6 to 3, namely the distances of the two electrons from the nucleus and the angle between the position vectors of the two electrons. He obtained results in much better agreement with the experiments with a mechanical desk calculator. The result was well received, but the discrepancy of 0.12 eV continued to bother him. A breakthrough was achieved in 1928, when Hylleraas realized the angle coordinate needed to be replaced by the distance between the two electrons. With only three terms in the wave function expansion, the error had been reduced to 0.03 eV, with six terms to 0.01 eV. His work was quickly applied to other two-electron atoms and the hydrogen molecule.

== Awards ==
- Gunnerus Medal (1960)

== Selected publications ==
- Hylleraas, Egil A. (1928). "Über den Grundzustand des Heliumatoms". Zeitschrift für Physik. 48 (7–8): 469–494. Bibcode:1928ZPhy...48..469H. doi:10.1007/BF01340013. S2CID 121512045.
- Hylleraas, Egil A. (1929). "Neue Berechnung der Energie des Heliums im Grundzustande, sowie des tiefsten Terms von Ortho-Helium". Zeitschrift für Physik. 54 (5–6): 347–366. Bibcode:1929ZPhy...54..347H. doi:10.1007/BF01375457. S2CID 119898248. (over 1830 citations)
- Hylleraas, Egil A. (1930). "Über den Grundterm der Zweielektronenprobleme von H^{–}, He, Li^{+}, Be^{++} usw". Zeitschrift für Physik. 65 (3–4): 209–225. Bibcode:1930ZPhy...65..209H. doi:10.1007/BF01397032. S2CID 122152260.
- Hylleraas, Egil A.; Undheim, Bjarne (1930). "Numerische Berechnung der 2S-Terme von Ortho- und Par-Helium". Zeitschrift für Physik. 65 (11–12): 759–772. Bibcode:1930ZPhy...65..759H. doi:10.1007/BF01397263. S2CID 121637176.
- Hylleraas, Egil A. (1931). "Über die Elektronenterme des Wasserstoffmoleküls". Zeitschrift für Physik. 71 (11–12): 739–763. Bibcode:1931ZPhy...71..739H. doi:10.1007/BF01344443. S2CID 121844820.
- Hylleraas, Egil A.; Ore, Aadne (1947). "Binding Energy of the Positronium Molecule". Physical Review. 71 (8): 493–496. Bibcode:1947PhRv...71..493H. doi:10.1103/PhysRev.71.493.
- Hylleraas, Egil A. (1963). "On the inversion of eigenvalue problems". Annals of Physics. 25 (3): 309–324. Bibcode:1963AnPhy..25..309H. doi:10.1016/0003-4916(63)90016-2. hdl:2027/mdp.39015095148113.
- Hylleraas, Egil Andersen (1963). Resonance Method in Scattering Theory. Aerospace Research Laboratories, Office of Aerospace Research, United States Air Force; 21 pages
- Hylleraas, Egil A. (1964). The Schrödinger Two-Electron Atomic Problem. Advances in Quantum Chemistry. Vol. 1. pp. 1–33. doi:10.1016/S0065-3276(08)60373-1. ISBN 9780120348015.

== See also ==
- Two-electron atom
