= Selective laser melting =

3D printing technique

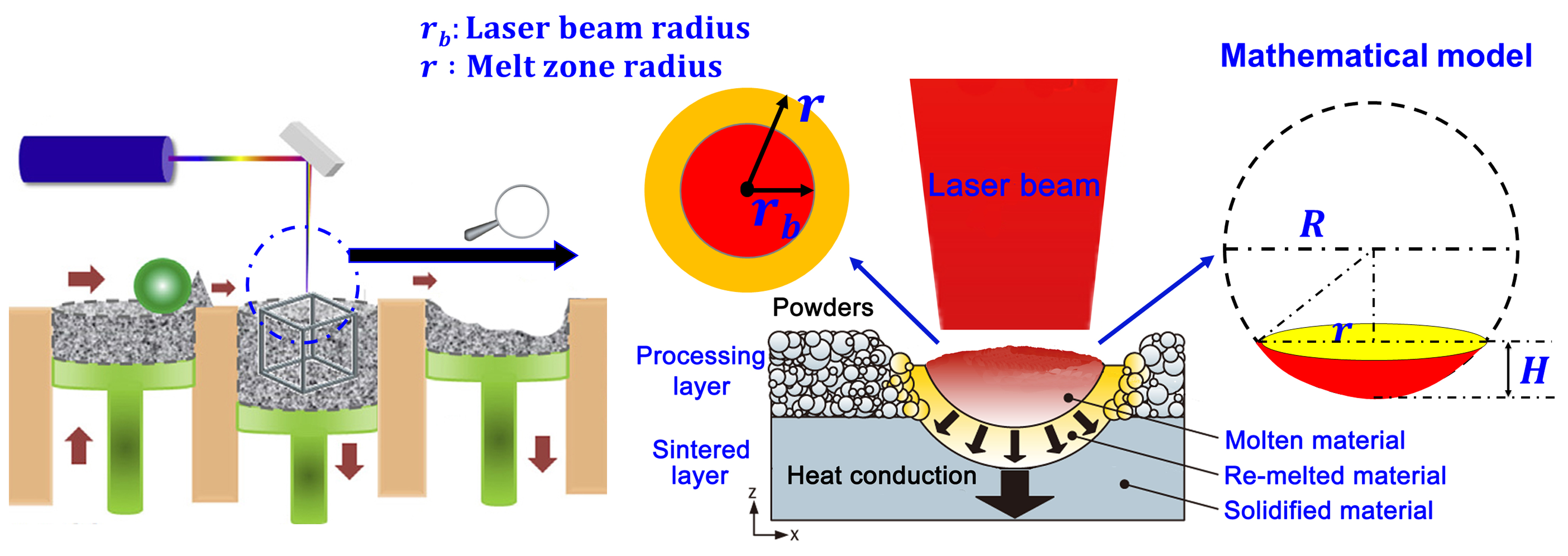
Schematic of selective laser melting and the heat transfer in molten pool

Selective laser melting (SLM) is one of many proprietary names for a metal additive manufacturing (AM) technology that uses a bed of powder with a source of heat to create metal parts. Also known as direct metal laser sintering (DMLS), the ASTM standard term is powder bed fusion (PBF). PBF is a rapid prototyping, 3D printing, or additive manufacturing technique designed to use a high power-density laser to melt and fuse metallic powders together.

== History ==
Selective laser melting is one of many proprietary powder bed fusion technologies, started in 1995 at the Fraunhofer Institute ILT in Aachen, Germany. A research project run by Wilhelm Meiners, Konrad Wissenbach, and Andres Gasser resulted in the so-called basic ILT SLM patent.

The ASTM International F42 standards committee has grouped selective laser melting into the category of "laser sintering", although this is an acknowledged misnomer because the process fully melts the metal into a solid homogeneous fully dense mass, unlike selective laser sintering (SLS) which is a true sintering process. Another name for selective laser melting is direct metal laser sintering (DMLS), a name deposited by the EOS brand, however misleading on the real process because the part is being melted during the production, not sintered, which means the part is fully dense.

A similar process is electron beam melting (EBM), which uses an electron beam as the energy source.

== Process ==
Selective laser melting is able to process a variety of alloys, allowing prototypes to be functional hardware made out of the same material as production components. Since the components are built layer by layer, it is possible to design complex freeform geometries, internal features and challenging internal passages that could not be produced using conventional manufacturing techniques such as casting or otherwise machined. SLM produces fully dense durable metal parts that work well as both functional prototypes or end-use production parts.

The process starts by slicing the 3D CAD file data into layers, usually from 20 to 100 micrometers thick, creating a 2D cross-section of each layer; this file format is the industry standard .stl file used on most layer-based 3D printing or stereolithography technologies. This file is then loaded into a file preparation software package that assigns parameters, values and physical supports that allow the file to be interpreted and built by different types of additive manufacturing machines.

With selective laser melting, thin layers of atomized metal powder are evenly distributed using a re-coating mechanism onto a substrate plate, usually metal, that is fastened to an indexing platform that moves in the vertical (Z) axis. This takes place inside a chamber containing a tightly controlled atmosphere of inert gas, either argon or nitrogen at oxygen levels below 1000 parts per million. Once each layer has been distributed, each 2D slice of the part geometry is fused by selectively melting the powder. This is accomplished with a high-power laser beam, usually an ytterbium fiber laser with hundreds of watts. The laser beam is directed in the X and Y directions with two high frequency scanning mirrors and remains in focus along the layer utilising an F-Theta lens arrangement. The laser energy is intense and focused enough to permit full melting (fusion) of the particles to form a solid structure. The process is repeated layer after layer until the part is complete.

SLM machines predominantly uses a high-powered Yb-fiber optic laser with standard laser powers ranging from 100–1000 W. Inside the build chamber area, there is a material dispensing platform and a build platform along with a recoater system (blade or roller) used to evenly spread new powder across the build platform. Parts are built up additively layer by layer, typically using layers 30–60 micrometers thick.

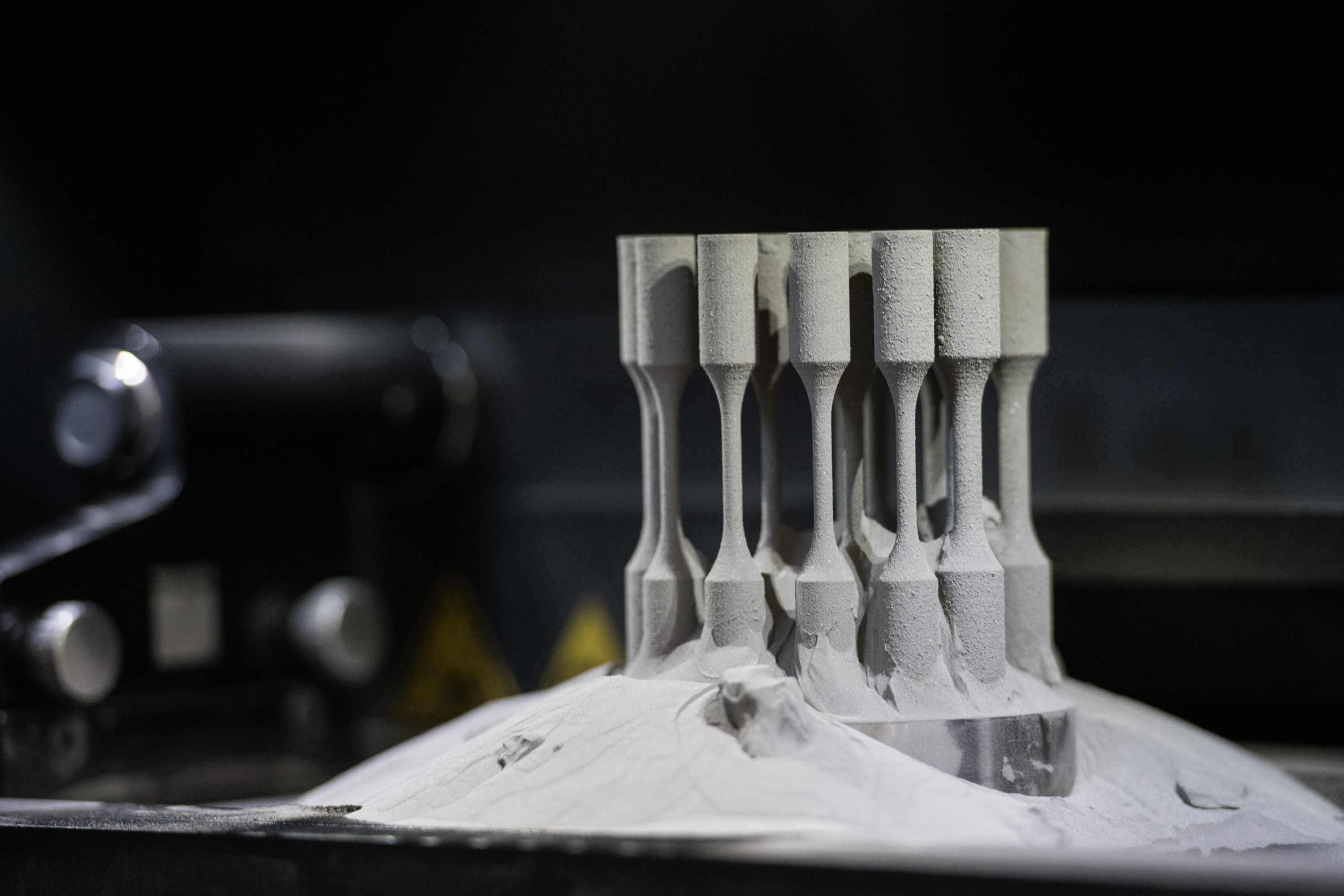
Print finished (excess powder cleaned)

== Materials ==
Selective laser melting (SLM) machines can operate with a work space up to 1 m (39.37 in) in X, Y and Z. Some of the materials being used in this process can include Ni based super alloys, copper, aluminum, stainless steel, tool steel, cobalt chrome, titanium and tungsten. SLM is especially useful for producing tungsten parts because of the high melting point and high ductile-brittle transition temperature of this metal. In order for the material to be used in the process it must exist in atomized form (powder form). These powders are generally gas atomized prealloys, being the most economical process to obtain spherical powders on an industrial scale. Other processes capable of producing highly spherical powders suitable for SLM include electrode induction-melting gas atomization (EIGA), plasma rotating electrode process (PREP), and plasma atomization. These crucible-free methods are particularly advantageous for reactive metals such as titanium alloys, where contact with ceramic crucibles during gas atomization can introduce oxygen contamination. Sphericity is desired because it guarantees a high flowability and packing density, which translates into fast and reproducible spreading of the powder layers. Highly spherical powders with a low level of internal porosity are produced by plasma atomization and powder spheroidization. To further optimize flowability, narrow particle size distributions with a low percentage of fine particles like 15 – 45 μm or 20 – 63 μm are typically employed. Currently available alloys used in the process include AISI 316L, AISI 304, C67, F53, H13, 17-4 PH and 15-5 stainless steel, maraging steel, cobalt chromium, inconel 625 and 718, copper-based alloys (CW510 Brass, Ecobrass, Bronze), aluminum AlSi10Mg, and titanium Ti6Al4V. The copper-chromium-zirconium alloy (CuCrZr) is a precipitation-hardening copper alloy that, unlike pure copper, can be processed with conventional infrared lasers in laser powder bed fusion because the alloying additions raise the effective laser absorptivity. Parameter-optimization studies have produced dense CuCrZr components directly from powder, with the final strength and electrical conductivity controlled by the process parameters together with the subsequent solution-annealing and age-hardening heat treatments, which precipitate fine chromium-rich phases. Copper is attractive for additively manufactured electrical and thermal-management components—including electric motor windings, heat exchangers, induction coils, and radio-frequency devices—owing to its high electrical and thermal conductivity. A 2025 survey of copper additive manufacturing identified these application drivers, together with high-power infrared and green/blue laser systems, tailored copper powders, and controlled process atmospheres, as the principal routes to industrial adoption.

The mechanical properties of samples produced using selective laser melting differ from those manufactured using casting. AlSiMg samples produced using direct metal laser sintering exhibit a higher yield strength than those constructed of commercial as-cast A360.0 alloy by 43% when constructed along the xy-plane and 36% along the z-plane. While the yield strength of AlSiMg has been shown to increase in both the xy-plane and z-plane, the elongation at break decreases along the build direction. These improvement of the mechanical properties of the direct metal laser sintering samples has been attributed to a very fine microstructure.

Additionally, industry pressure has added more superalloy powders to the available processing including AM108. It is not only the Print operation and orientation that provides a change in material properties, it is also the required post processing via Hot Isostatic Pressure (HIP) Heat Treat and shot peen that change mechanical properties to a level of noticeable difference in comparison to equiaxed cast or wrought materials. Based on research done at the Tokyo Metropolitan University, it is shown that creep rupture and ductility are typically lower for additive printed Ni based superalloys compared to wrought or cast material. The directionality of print is a major influencing factor along with grain size. Additionally, wear properties are typically better as seen with the studies done on additive Inconel 718 due to surface condition; the study also demonstrated the laser power's influence on density and microstructure. Material Density that is generated during the laser processing parameters can further influence crack behavior such that crack reopening post HIP process is reduced when density is increased. It is critical to have a full overview of the material along with its processing from print to required post-print to be able to finalize the mechanical properties for design use.

== Overview and benefits ==
Benefits of selective laser melting include:

- Reducing costs
- Reducing the time between design and manufacture
- Reducing the number of parts needed within a design
- Reducing the weight of a product
- Improving a product's functionality

Current challenges that occur with SLM are having a limit in processable materials, having undeveloped process settings and metallurgical defects such as cracking and porosity. The future challenges are being unable to create fully dense parts due to the processing of aluminum alloys. Aluminum powders are lightweight, have high reflectivity, high thermal conductivity, and low laser absorptivity in the range of wavelengths of the fiber lasers which are used in SLM. Pure copper presents similar but more severe challenges, with infrared laser reflectivity exceeding 90% and thermal conductivity around 400 W/(m·K), which can result in lack of fusion, high porosity, and potential damage to laser optics.To overcome the low infrared absorptivity of copper, short-wavelength green (515–532 nm) and blue (450 nm) laser sources have been developed for laser powder bed fusion. At these wavelengths, the absorptivity of copper increases to approximately 40–60%, compared to less than 5% at the conventional infrared wavelength of ~1070 nm. This enables the production of high-density copper components with electrical conductivity above 95% IACS, making LPBF viable for thermal management devices such as heat sinks, heat exchangers, and induction coil geometries.

These challenges can be improved with doing more research in how the materials interact when being fused together.

== Defect formation ==
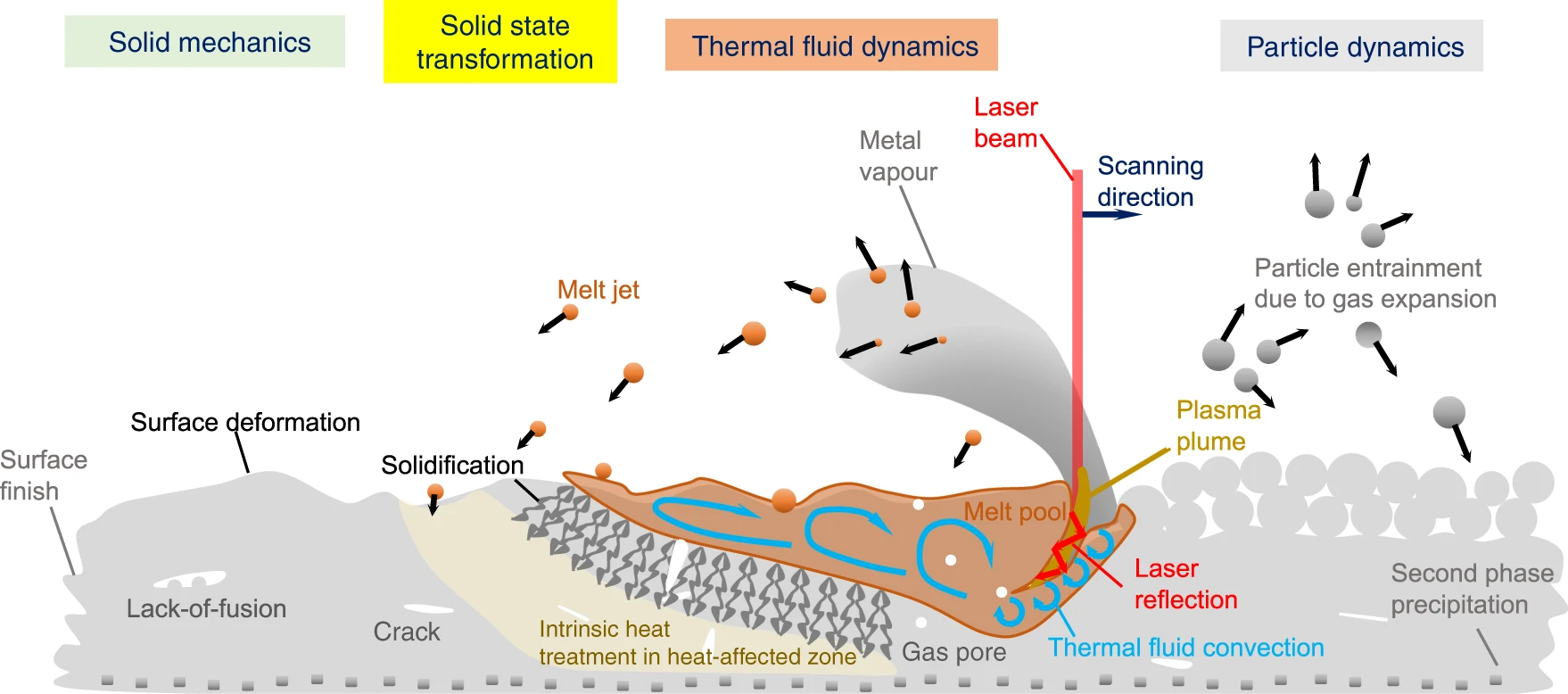
Schematic of major defects and microstructural phenomena produced through 3D-printing as it relates to SLM, particularly regarding solid state transformations, thermal fluid dynamics, and particle dynamics.

Despite the large successes that SLM has provided to additive manufacturing, the process of melting a powdered medium with a concentrated laser yields various microstructural defects through numerous mechanisms that can detrimentally affect the overall functionality and strength of the manufactured part. Although there are many defects that have been researched, we will review some of the major defects that may arise from SLM in this section.

Two of the most common mechanical defects include lack of fusion (LOF) or cracking within solidified regions. LOF involves the entrapment of gas within the structure rather than a cohesive solid. These defects can arise from not using a laser source with adequate power or scanning across the powdered surface too quickly, thereby melting the metal insufficiently and preventing a strong bonding environment for solidification. Cracking is another mechanical defect in which low thermal conductivity and high thermal expansion coefficients generate sufficiently high amounts of internal stresses to break bonds within the material, especially along grain boundaries where dislocations are present.

Additionally, although SLM solidifies a structure from molten metal, the thermal fluid dynamics of the system often produces inhomogeneous compositions or unintended porosity which can cumulatively affect the overall strength and fatigue life of a printed structure. For example, the directed laser beam can induce convection currents upon direct impact in a narrow "keyhole" zone or throughout the semi-molten metal that can impact the material's overall composition. Similarly, it is found that during solidification, dendritic microstructures progress along temperature gradients at different speeds, thus producing different segregation profiles within the material. Ultimately, these thermal fluid dynamical phenomena generate unwanted inconsistencies within the printed material, and further research into mitigating these effects will continue to be necessary.

Pore formation is a very important defect when samples are printed using SLM. Pores are revealed to form during changes in laser scan velocity due to the rapid formation then collapse of deep keyhole depressions in the surface which traps inert shielding gas in the solidifying metal. Another possible reason for pore formation is the so-called balling effect which was frequently obtained in case of austenitic stainless steels. Poor surface wettability and low energy inputs might lead to break-up of the melt track to minimize energy. Consequently, several spherical melting spots form, leaving pores after solidification.

Lastly, secondary effects that arise from the laser beam can unintentionally affect the structure's properties. One such example is the development of secondary phase precipitates within the bulk structure due to the repetitive heating within solidified lower layers as the laser beam scans across the powder bed. Depending on the composition of the precipitates, this effect can remove important elements from the bulk material or even embrittle the printed structure. Not only that, in powder beds containing oxides, the power of the laser and produced convection currents can vaporize and "splatter" oxides at other locations. These oxides accumulate and have a non-wetting behavior, thereby producing a slag that not only removes the beneficial nature of oxide within the composition but also provides a mechanistically favorable microenvironment for material cracking.

== Mechanical properties ==
High temperature gradients are presented during selective laser melting (SLM) processes, which causes non-equilibrium conditions at the solid/liquid interface, thereby leading to rapid solidification as the melt pool undergoes a phase transformation from liquid to solid. As a consequence, a wide range of effects might take place like the formation of non-equilibrium phases and changes in the microstructure.

For the reasons above, the mechanical properties of alloys produced by SLM can deviate substantially from those conventionally manufactured counterparts in their as-built state. A central characteristic of SLM-manufactured alloys is large anisotropy in mechanical properties . While the grain structure in cast metals is typically characterized by roughly uniform, isotropic grains, alloys manufactured using SLM exhibit substantial elongation of grains in the build direction. The anisotropy in grain structure is associated with anisotropy in the distribution of defects, the direction of crack propagation, and ultimately the mechanical properties.

On the other hand, because of the special thermo-kinetic features associated with SLM, there are many novel microstructural architectures unique to this process . As a new processing technique, SLM can produce a unique microstructure that is difficult to achieve using conventional techniques.

=== Nickel-based superalloys ===
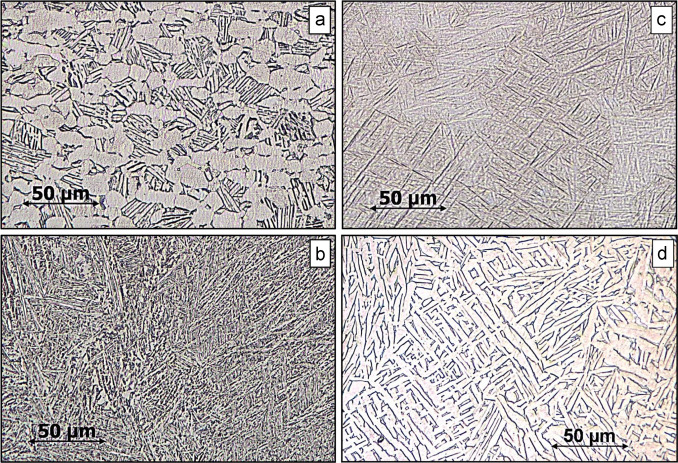
Microstructures of Ti6-Al-4V; wrought (a), SLM horizontal (b), SLM vertical (c) and SLM horizontal after heat treatment at 900 °C and 102 MPa (d)

Enhancements in creep resistance, ultimate tensile strength and toughness have been reported in nickel alloys. Inconel IN625, a precipitation-hardened nickel-chromium alloy, showed equal or even higher creep strength at elevated temperatures of 650 ̊C and 800 ̊C than wrought IN625. However, SLM-manufactured IN625 exhibited inferior ductility under creep testing conditions. By deploying cyclic heat treatments, both SLM and wrought IN625 obtained some additional strength. The amount of extra strength in the alloys was generally proportional to the matrix volume fraction of γ phase (at 650 ̊C) and δ phase (at 800 ̊C).

The fatigue strength and hardness of SLM-manufactured alloys when handling cyclic loads at high temperature, however, tends to be significantly inferior to that of cast or wrought alloys. For another superalloy Inconel IN718, researchers found the additively manufactured material showed large columnar grains with an orientation parallel to the building direction, whereas the wrought material showed a fine-grained structure with no significant texture.

SLM-based additive manufacturing of nickel superalloys still poses significant challenges due to these alloys' complex composition. With multiple alloying elements and high aluminum/titanium fraction, these materials, when consolidated through SLM form various secondary phases, which affects the processability and leading to weakness within the structure.

=== Iron-based alloys (stainless steels) ===
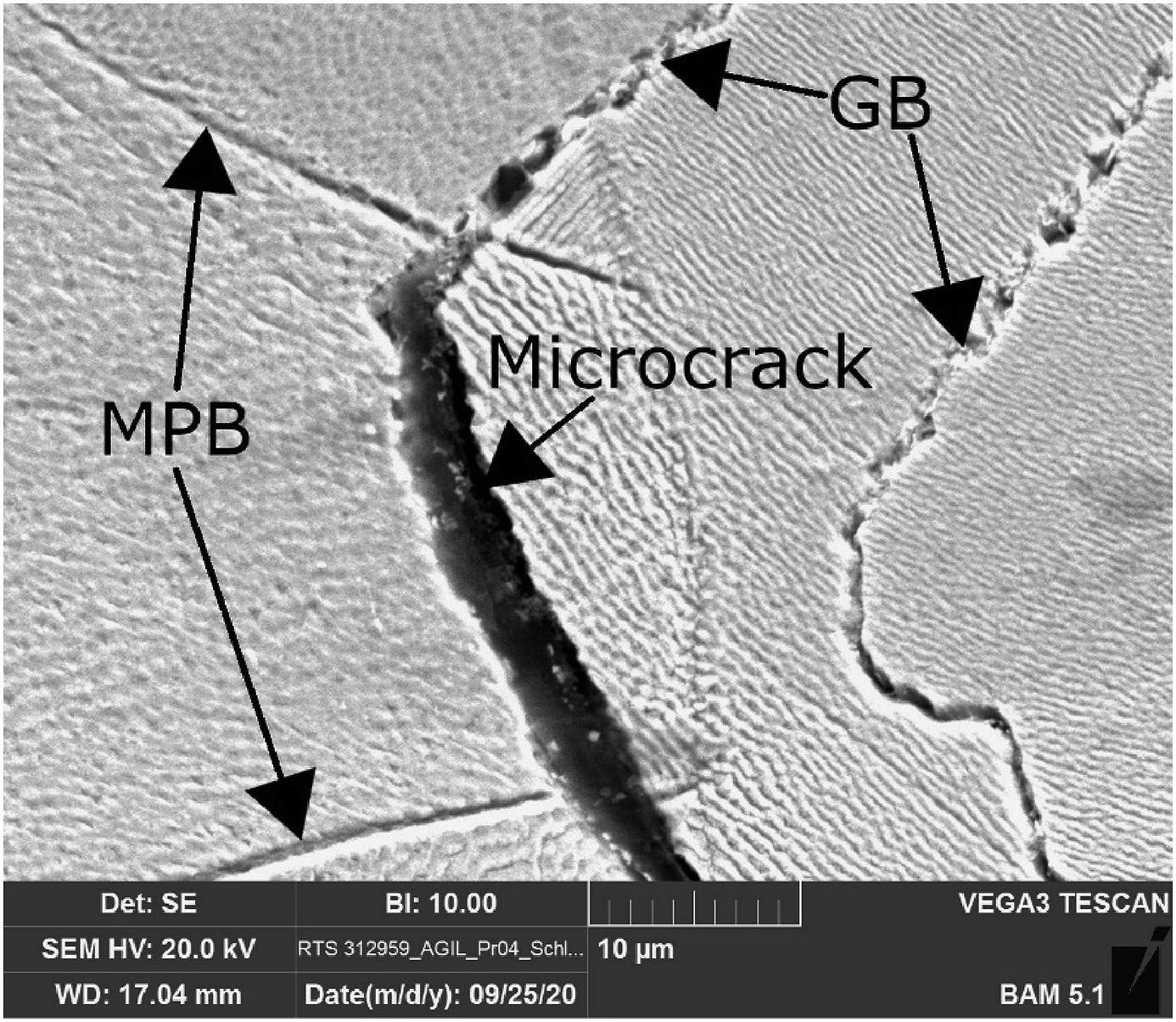
An SEM image of a region near a microcrack in the SLM 316L material. Partially cracked grain boundaries (GB) and melt pool boundaries (MPB) are visible

Stainless steel grade 316L is an austenitic iron-based alloy that features a low carbon content (< 0.03%). Tensile tests and creep tests of 316L steel performed at 600 °C and 650 °C concluded that the SLM steel reached the minimum creep rate at significantly lower creep strains, around one decade lower, compared to the wrought counterpart. The cellular structure is considered to be the main cause of the differences in deformation behavior, especially during the first creep stage, primarily because it limits the work-hardening capacity of the material. The ultimate tensile strength (UTS) is also lower for AM specimens since strain hardening is insignificant.

The fracture in the SLM-manufactured material is mainly between the grains. The grain boundary damage leads to cracking and subsequently to the failure of the material. The deformation is caused and accelerated by the appearance of precipitates at the grain boundaries. The higher stacking fault energy (SFE) of SLM 316L steel presumably also contributed to its creep behavior.

== Applications ==
The types of applications most suited to the selective laser melting process are complex geometries and structures with thin walls and hidden voids or channels on the one hand or low lot sizes on the other hand. Advantage can be gained when producing hybrid forms where solid and partially formed or lattice type geometries can be produced together to create a single object, such as a hip stem or acetabular cup or other orthopedic implant where osseointegration is enhanced by the surface geometry. Much of the pioneering work with selective laser melting technologies is on lightweight parts for aerospace where traditional manufacturing constraints, such as tooling and physical access to surfaces for machining, restrict the design of components. SLM allows parts to be built additively to form near net shape components rather than by removing waste material.

Traditional high-volume manufacturing techniques have a relatively high set-up cost (e.g. Injection moulding, Forging, Investment casting). While SLM currently has a high cost per part owing to its time sensitivity and the overall capital costs of the equipment. However, for limited quantities of bespoke customizable parts, the process remains attractive for a number or uses. This is the case e.g. for spares/replacement parts for obsolete equipment and machines (e.g. vintage cars) or customizable products like implants designed for individual patients.

Tests by NASA's Marshall Space Flight Center, which is experimenting with the technique to make some difficult-to-fabricate parts from nickel alloys for the J-2X and RS-25 rocket engines, show that difficult to make parts made with the technique are somewhat weaker than forged and milled parts but often avoid the need for welds which are weak points.

This technology is used to manufacture direct parts for a variety of industries including aerospace, dental, medical and other industries that have small to medium size, highly complex parts and the tooling industry to make direct tooling inserts or those requiring short lead times. The technology is used both for rapid prototyping, as it decreases development time for new products, and production manufacturing as a cost saving method to simplify assemblies and complex geometries.

The Northwestern Polytechnical University of China is using a similar system to build structural titanium parts for aircraft. An EADS study shows that use of the process would reduce materials and waste in aerospace applications.

On September 5, 2013 Elon Musk tweeted an image of SpaceX's regeneratively-cooled SuperDraco rocket engine chamber emerging from an EOS 3D metal printer, noting that it was composed of the Inconel superalloy. In a surprise move, SpaceX announced in May 2014 that the flight-qualified version of the SuperDraco engine is fully printed, and is the first fully printed rocket engine. Using Inconel, an alloy of nickel and iron, additively-manufactured by direct metal laser sintering, the engine operates at a chamber pressure of 6,900 kilopascals (1,000 psi) at a very high temperature. The engines are contained in a printed protective nacelle, also DMLS-printed, to prevent fault propagation in the event of an engine failure. The engine completed a full qualification test in May 2014, and is slated to make its first orbital spaceflight in April 2018.

The ability to 3D print the complex parts was key to achieving the low-mass objective of the engine. According to Elon Musk, "It's a very complex engine, and it was very difficult to form all the cooling channels, the injector head, and the throttling mechanism. Being able to print very high strength advanced alloys ... was crucial to being able to create the SuperDraco engine as it is." The 3D printing process for the SuperDraco engine dramatically reduces lead-time compared to the traditional cast parts, and "has superior strength, ductility, and fracture resistance, with a lower variability in materials properties."

Also in 2018, the FDA approved the first-ever 3D printed spine implant made from titanium using SLM.

=== Industry applications ===
- Aerospace – Air ducts, fixtures or mountings holding specific aeronautic instruments, laser-sintering fits both the needs of commercial and military aerospace
- Energy – Laser-melting can be used to produce innovative pump impellers, high pressure reactors and hard-to-find spare parts
- Manufacturing – Laser-sintering can serve niche markets with low volumes at competitive costs. Laser-sintering is independent of economies of scale, thus liberating one from focusing on batch size optimization.
- Medical – Medical devices are complex, high value products. They have to meet customer requirements exactly. These requirements do not only stem from the operator's personal preferences: legal requirements or norms that differ widely between regions also have to be complied with. This leads to a multitude of varieties and thus small volumes of the variants offered. In addition, the research focus on additive manufacturing of biodegradable metals to produce implants is becoming more and more popular.
- Prototyping – Laser-sintering can help by making design and functional prototypes available. As a result, functional testing can be initiated quickly and flexibly. At the same time, these prototypes can be used to gauge potential customer acceptance.
- Tooling – The direct process eliminates tool-path generation and multiple machining processes such as EDM. Tool inserts are built overnight or even in just a few hours. Also the freedom of design can be used to optimize tool performance, for example by integrating conformal cooling channels into the tool.

=== Other applications ===
- Parts with cavities, undercuts, draft angles
- Fit, form, and function models
- Tooling, fixtures, and jigs
- Conformal cooling channels
- Rotors and impellers
- Complex bracketing

Laser melting can produce chemical structures (pure metals, their oxides and carbides), and physical structures (homogeneous, alloys, composites, gold-iron, gold-cobalt, gold-nickel alloys).

== Potential ==
Selective laser melting or additive manufacturing, sometimes referred to as rapid manufacturing or rapid prototyping, is in its infancy with relatively few users in comparison to conventional methods such as machining, casting or forging metals. Like any process or method selective laser melting must be suited to the task at hand. Markets such as aerospace or medical orthopedics have been evaluating the technology as a manufacturing process. Barriers to acceptance are high and compliance issues result in long periods of certification and qualification. This is demonstrated by the lack of fully formed international standards by which to measure the performance of competing systems. The standard in question is ASTM F2792-10 Standard Terminology for Additive Manufacturing Technologies.

== Difference from selective laser sintering (SLS) ==
The use of SLS refers to the process as applied to a variety of materials such as plastics, glass, and ceramics, as well as metals. What sets SLM apart from other 3D printing process is the ability to fully melt the powder, rather than heating it up to a specific point where the powder grains can fuse together, allowing the porosity of the material to be controlled. On the other hand, SLM can go one step further than SLS, by using the laser to fully melt the metal, meaning the powder is not being fused together but actually liquified long enough to melt the powder grains into a homogeneous part. Therefore, SLM can produce stronger parts because of reduced porosity and greater control over crystal structure, which helps prevent part failure. Additionally, certain types of nanoparticles with minimized lattice misfit, similar atomic packing along matched crystallographic planes and thermodynamic stability can be introduced into metal powder to serve as grain refinement nucleates to achieve crack-free, equiaxed, fine-grained microstructures. However, SLM is only feasible when using a single metal powder.

== Benefits ==
SLM has many benefits over traditional manufacturing techniques. The ability to quickly produce a unique part is the most obvious because no special tooling is required and parts can be built in a matter of hours.

SLM is also one of the few additive manufacturing technologies being used in production. Since the components are built layer by layer, it is possible to design internal features and passages that could not be cast or otherwise machined. Complex geometries and assemblies with multiple components can be simplified to lighter and fewer parts with a more cost-effective assembly. SLM does not require special tooling like castings, so it is convenient for short production runs.

== Environmental impact ==
There are various components, environments, and material considerations that can affect the environmental impact that the SLM process has. First, the embodied energy that was used to make the printer, which has more than 500 parts, contributes around 124,000 MJ for a standard Renishaw AM250. The most prominent material is steel, which is 100% recyclable. To truly take advantage of the recyclability, a cradle-to-cradle approach can be implemented to ensure that all steel parts are properly discarded of at their end-life through disassembly. The electricity usage is often the most energy intensive part of the printer, as the high power lasers, chillers, configurations, and part separation all contribute to this. Less volume of parts, more active time, more active idle time (coolers running), and electrical discharge machining (EDM) all increase the energy usage. The higher end of on-site energy during use can be around 640 MJ per part while more efficient use is around 40 MJ per part. In this, a main factor that can be optimized for environmental friendliness is the use of fully renewable energy rather than electricity made through gas or coal. Considering now embodied energy of the total lifecycle, at the energy intensive end is less efficient printing processes totaling 2400+ MJ per part while more efficient processes can be as low as 140 MJ per part. Ultimately, the total embodied energy considering all parts made is dependent on many factors but is almost always dominant during the printing phase and more specifically during long idle times and post-processing part removal through EDM. The exception to this is in research environments where the machine is not constantly used and use is more infrequent, in this case, the embodied energy from primary processing and manufacturing is dominant.

Transportation costs will vary on manufacturing plants and consumers but these values are often negligible (<1%) in comparison to other high impacting parts of the SLM lifecycle. Other factors that are negligible, yet sometimes varied, are: inert gas use, material (powder) waste, materials used, atomization, and disposal of machine components.

Depending on the part made and its intended use, SLM can help make more lightweight parts with complex dimensions which reduce both energy intensive post-processing machining such as EDM or computer numerical control (CNC) machining and decrease part weight. Often a direct comparison can only be made by looking at parts made through two different processes. An example is a turbine blade manufactured by investment casting and SLM, where 10853.34 kWh and 10181.57 kWh were used to make the same part, respectively. Also conventional manufacturing contributed to 7,325 kgCO_{2} while AM had 7,027 kgCO_{2} of emissions. This means that in this specific scenario AM is beneficial by 4%, which could be significant over the 25,578 aircraft worldwide. Another example is the 1 kg weight reduction through a hydraulic valve body which estimates a saving of 24,500L of jet fuel and 63 tons of CO_{2} emissions from a lightweight design and decreased material used compared to traditional manufacturing methods. SLM is often a more sustainable option due to decreased raw material use, less complex tool use, lightweight part potential, near-perfect final geometries, and on-demand manufacturing.

== Constraints ==
The aspects of size, feature details and surface finish, as well as print through dimensional error in the Z axis may be factors that should be considered prior to the use of the technology. However, by planning the build in the machine where most features are built in the x and y axis as the material is laid down, the feature tolerances can be managed well. Surfaces usually have to be polished to achieve mirror or extremely smooth finishes.

For production tooling, material density of a finished part or insert should be addressed prior to use. For example, in injection molding inserts, any surface imperfections will cause imperfections in the plastic part, and the inserts will have to mate with the base of the mold with temperature and surfaces to prevent problems.

Independent of the material system used, the SLM process leaves a grainy surface finish due to "powder particle size, layer-wise building sequence and [the spreading of the metal powder prior to sintering by the powder distribution mechanism]."

Metallic support structure removal and post processing of the part generated may be a time-consuming process and require the use of machining, EDM and/or grinding machines having the same level of accuracy provided by the RP machine.

Laser polishing by means of shallow surface melting of SLM produced parts is able to reduce surface roughness by use of a fast-moving laser beam providing "just enough heat energy to cause melting of the surface peaks. The molten mass then flows into the surface valleys by surface tension, gravity and laser pressure, thus diminishing the roughness."

When using rapid prototyping machines, .stl files, which do not include anything but raw mesh data in binary (generated from Solid Works, CATIA, or other major CAD programs) need further conversion to .cli and .sli files (the format required for non-stereolithography machines). Software converts .stl file to .sli files, as with the rest of the process, there can be costs associated with this step.

== Machine components ==
The typical components of a SLM machine include: laser source, roller, platform piston, removable build plate, supply powder, supply doses (e.g. piston), and optics and mirrors. The typical build envelope across most platforms are (e.g., for EOS M 290) of 250 x 250 x 325 mm, and the ability to 'grow' multiple parts at one time,

== See also ==
- 3D printing
- Laser metal deposition
- Desktop manufacturing
- Digital fabricator
- Direct digital manufacturing
- List of notable 3D printed weapons and parts
- Rapid manufacturing
- Selective laser sintering
- Solid freeform fabrication
- Stereolithography
