= Rule of mixtures =

Relation between properties and composition of a compound

The upper and lower bounds on the elastic modulus of a composite material assuming equal Poisson's coefficients.

In materials science, a general rule of mixtures is a weighted mean used to predict various properties of a composite material . It provides a theoretical upper- and lower-bound on properties such as the elastic modulus, thermal conductivity, and electrical conductivity.

In general there are two models. The rule of mixtures (the Voigt model) is derived under the assumption that the strain in both constituents is equal. The inverse rule of mixtures (the Reuss model) is found if the stress in both constituents is assumed equal. Respectively, these could model axial- and transverse loading in a fiber-reinforced composite material.

For the Young's modulus $E$, the rule of mixtures states that the overall modulus equals

$$\overline{E}_V = fE_1 + \left(1-f\right)E_2$$.

The inverse rule of mixtures states that Young's modulus equals

$$\overline{E}_R = \left(\frac{f}{E_1} + \frac{1-f}{E_2}\right)^{-1}.$$

where

- $f = \frac{V_1}{V_1 + V_2}$ is the volume fraction of the first constituent
- $E_1, E_2$ are the stiffness of constituents 1 and 2 respectively
- $\overline{E}_V, \overline{E}_R$ are the stiffnesses homogenized according to the Voigt and Reuss assumptions respectively

These two moduli are often treated as an upper- and lower bound, with the actual modulus lying somewhere in between.

== Derivation for elastic modulus ==
=== Rule of mixtures / Voigt model / equal strain ===
Consider a composite material under uniaxial tension $\sigma_\infty$. Under the Voigt assumption, we model the strain in the two constituents as equal. In the context of fiber-reinforced composites, one might interpret this as an applied strain along the fiber direction. Hooke's law for uniaxial tension gives

$\frac{\sigma_1}{E_1} = \epsilon_1 = \overline{\epsilon} = \epsilon_2 = \frac{\sigma_2}{E_2}$	1

where $\sigma_1$ and $\sigma_2$ are the stresses of constituents 1 and 2 respectively, and we define the homogenized strain as $\overline{\epsilon}$. Noting stress to be a force per unit area, a force balance gives that

$\sigma_\infty = f\sigma_1 + \left(1-f\right)\sigma_2$	2

Equations 1 and 2 can be combined to give

$$\overline{E}_V \overline{\epsilon} = fE_1\epsilon_1 + \left(1-f\right)E_2\epsilon_2.$$

Finally, since $\overline{\epsilon} = \epsilon_1 = \epsilon_2$, the overall elastic modulus of the composite can be expressed as

$$\overline{E}_V = fE_1 + \left(1-f\right)E_2.$$

Assuming the Poisson's ratio of the two materials is the same, this represents the upper bound of the composite's elastic modulus.

=== Inverse rule of mixtures / Reuss-Cornu model / equal stress ===
Alternatively, we can assume that the stress in the two constituents is equal, i.e. $\sigma_\infty = \sigma_1 = \sigma_2$. This corresponds to the two constituents being loaded in series, which in the context of fiber-reinforced composites roughly corresponds to transverse loading. In this case, the overall strain is distributed according to

$$\overline{\epsilon} = f\epsilon_1 + \left(1-f\right)\epsilon_2.$$

The overall modulus in the material is then given by

$$\overline{E}_R = \frac{\sigma_\infty}{\overline{\epsilon}} = \frac{\sigma_1}{f\epsilon_1 + \left(1-f\right)\epsilon_2} = \left(\frac{f}{E_1} + \frac{1-f}{E_2}\right)^{-1}$$

since $\sigma_1=E_1\epsilon_1$, $\sigma_2=E_2\epsilon_2$.

== Other properties ==
Similar derivations give the rules of mixtures for

- mass density:
  $$\left(\frac{f}{\rho_1}+\frac{1-f}{\rho_2}\right)^{-1} \leq\ \overline{\rho} \leq  f \rho_1 + (1-f) \rho_2$$
- thermal conductivity:
  $$\left(\frac{f}{k_1} + \frac{1-f}{k_2}\right)^{-1} \leq \overline{k} \leq f k_1 + \left(1-f\right)k_2$$
- electrical conductivity:
  $$\left(\frac{f}{\sigma_1} + \frac{1-f}{\sigma_2}\right)^{-1} \leq \overline{\sigma} \leq f\sigma_1 + \left(1-f\right)\sigma_2$$

Notably, these forms are typically not applicable to strength-related properties. Consider the case where the strain in both phases is equal. Then, the rule of mixtures would only be applicable when both materials fail at the same strain. If this is not the case, the least ductile material will fail first. Thus, the strength of the composite would be determined not as a mix of constituent strengths, but rather as a function of the strength of a single constituent. In turn, this supposes that another failure mode, such as debonding, does not occur before either phase fails.

== Generalizations ==
=== Some proportion of rule of mixtures and inverse rule of mixtures ===
A generalized equation for any loading condition between isostrain and isostress can be written as:

$$(\overline{E})^k = f(E_1)^k + (1-f)(E_2)^k$$

where k is a value between 1 and −1.

=== More than 2 materials ===
For a composite containing a mixture of n different materials, each with a material property $E_i$ and volume fraction $V_i$, where

$$\sum_{i = 1}^{n}{V_i} = 1 ,$$

then the rule of mixtures can be shown to give:

$$\overline{E} = \sum_{i = 1}^{n}{V_i E_i}$$

and the inverse rule of mixtures can be shown to give:

$$\frac{1}{\overline{E}} = \sum_{i = 1}^{n}{\frac{V_i}{E_i}} .$$

Finally, generalizing to some combination of the rule of mixtures and inverse rule of mixtures for an n-component system gives:

$$(\overline{E})^k = \sum_{i=1}^{n}V_i(E_i)^k$$

== See also ==
When considering the empirical correlation of some physical properties and the chemical composition of compounds, other relationships, rules, or laws, also closely resembles the rule of mixtures:

- Amagat's law – Law of partial volumes of gases
- Gladstone–Dale equation – Optical analysis of liquids, glasses and crystals
- Kopp's law – Heat capacity, with f as the mass fraction
- Richmann's law – Law for the mixing temperature
- Vegard's law – Crystal lattice parameters
