= Gas laws =

Physical laws describing gases

The physical laws describing the behaviour of gases under fixed pressure, volume, amount of gas, and absolute temperature conditions are called gas laws. The basic gas laws were discovered by the end of the 18th century when scientists found out that relationships between pressure, volume and temperature of a sample of gas could be obtained which would hold to approximation for all gases. The combination of several empirical gas laws led to the development of the ideal gas law.

The ideal gas law was later found to be consistent with atomic and kinetic theory.

== History ==
In 1643, the Italian physicist and mathematician, Evangelista Torricelli, who for a few months had acted as Galileo Galilei's secretary, conducted a celebrated experiment in Florence. He demonstrated that a column of mercury in an inverted tube can be supported by the pressure of air outside of the tube, with the creation of a small section of vacuum above the mercury. This experiment essentially paved the way towards the invention of the barometer, as well as drawing the attention of Robert Boyle, then a "skeptical" scientist working in England. Boyle was inspired by Torricelli's experiment to investigate how the elasticity of air responds to varying pressure, and he did this through a series of experiments with a setup reminiscent of that used by Torricelli. Boyle published his results in 1662.

Later on, in 1676, the French physicist Edme Mariotte, independently arrived at the same conclusions of Boyle, while also noting some dependency of air volume on temperature. However it took another century and a half for the development of thermometry and recognition of the absolute zero temperature scale, which eventually allowed the discovery of temperature-dependent gas laws.

== Boyle's law ==
In 1662, Robert Boyle systematically studied the relationship between the volume and pressure of a fixed amount of gas at a constant temperature. He observed that the volume of a given mass of a gas is inversely proportional to its pressure at a constant temperature. Boyle's law, published in 1662, states that, at a constant temperature, the product of the pressure and volume of a given mass of an ideal gas in a closed system is always constant. It can be verified experimentally using a pressure gauge and a variable volume container. It can also be derived from the kinetic theory of gases: if a container, with a fixed number of molecules inside, is reduced in volume, more molecules will strike a given area of the sides of the container per unit time, causing a greater pressure.

=== Statement ===
Boyle's law states that:

The volume of a given mass of a gas is inversely related to its pressure when its temperature is kept constant.

The concept can be represented with these formulae:

- $V \propto \frac{1}{P}$, meaning "Volume is inversely proportional to Pressure", or
- $P \propto \frac{1}{V}$, meaning "Pressure is inversely proportional to Volume", or
- $P V = k_1$, or

$$P_1 V_1 = P_2 V_2$$
where P is the pressure, V is the volume of a gas, and k_{1} is the constant in this equation (and is not the same as the proportionality constants in the other equations).

== Charles' law ==
Charles' law, or the law of volumes, was founded in 1787 by Jacques Charles. It states that, for a given mass of an ideal gas at constant pressure, the volume is directly proportional to its absolute temperature, assuming in a closed system. The statement of Charles' law is as follows: the volume (V) of a given mass of a gas, at constant pressure (P), is directly proportional to its temperature (T).

=== Statement ===
Charles' law states that:

The volume of a given fixed mass of a dry gas is directly proportional to its absolute temperature at a constant pressure.

Therefore,

- $V \propto T\,$, or
- ${V \over T} = k_2$, or

$${V_1 \over T_1} = {V_2 \over T_2}$$,

where "V" is the volume of a gas, "T" is the absolute temperature and k_{2} is a proportionality constant (which is not the same as the proportionality constants in the other equations in this article).

== Gay-Lussac's law ==
Gay-Lussac's law, Amontons' law or the pressure law was founded by Joseph Louis Gay-Lussac in 1808.

=== Statement ===
Gay-Lussac's law states that:

The pressure exerted by a given mass and constant volume of an ideal gas on the sides of its container is directly proportional to its absolute temperature.

Therefore,

- $P \propto T\,$, or
- ${P \over T} = k$, or

$${P_1 \over T_1} = {P_2 \over T_2}$$,

where P is the pressure, T is the absolute temperature, and k is another proportionality constant.

== Avogadro's law ==
Avogadro's law, Avogadro's hypothesis, Avogadro's principle or Avogadro-Ampère's hypothesis is an experimental gas law which was hypothesized by Amedeo Avogadro in 1811. It related the volume of a gas to the amount of substance of gas present.

=== Statement ===
Avogadro's law states that:

The volume occupied by an ideal gas at a constant temperature is directly proportional to the number of molecules of the gas present in the container.

This statement gives rise to the molar volume of a gas, which at STP (273.15 K, 1 atm) is about 22.4 L. The relation is given by:

$V \propto n\,$, or
$$\frac{V_1}{n_1}=\frac{V_2}{n_2}    \,$$
where n is equal to the number of molecules of gas (or the number of moles of gas).

== Combined and ideal gas laws ==
Relationships between Boyle's, Charles's, Gay-Lussac's, Avogadro's, combined and ideal gas laws, with the Boltzmann constant k = R/N_{A} = (n R)/N (in each law, properties circled are variable and properties not circled are held constant)

The combined gas law or general gas equation is obtained by combining Boyle's law, Charles's law, and Gay-Lussac's law. It shows the relationship between the pressure, volume, and temperature for a fixed mass of gas:

$$PV = k_5 T$$

This can also be written as:

$$\frac {P_1V_1}{T_1}= \frac {P_2V_2}{T_2}$$

With the addition of Avogadro's law, the combined gas law develops into the ideal gas law:

$$PV = nRT$$
where P is the pressure, V is volume, n is the number of moles, R is the universal gas constant and T is the absolute temperature.
The proportionality constant, now named R, is the universal gas constant with a value of 8.3144598 (kPa∙L)/(mol∙K).

An equivalent formulation of this law is:

$$PV = Nk_\text{B}T$$
where P is the pressure, V is the volume, N is the number of gas molecules, k_{B} is the Boltzmann constant (1.381×10^{−23}J·K^{−1} in SI units) and T is the absolute temperature.

These equations are exact only for an ideal gas, which neglects various intermolecular effects (see real gas). However, the ideal gas law is a good approximation for most gases under moderate pressure and temperature.

This law has the following important consequences:

1. If temperature and pressure are kept constant, then the volume of the gas is directly proportional to the number of molecules of gas.
2. If the temperature and volume remain constant, then the pressure of the gas changes is directly proportional to the number of molecules of gas present.
3. If the number of gas molecules and the temperature remain constant, then the pressure is inversely proportional to the volume.
4. If the temperature changes and the number of gas molecules are kept constant, then either pressure or volume (or both) will change in direct proportion to the temperature.

== Other gas laws ==
Graham's law
This law states that the rate at which gas molecules diffuse is inversely proportional to the square root of the gas density at a constant temperature. Combined with Avogadro's law (i.e. since equal volumes have an equal number of molecules) this is the same as being inversely proportional to the root of the molecular weight.
Dalton's law of partial pressures
This law states that the pressure of a mixture of gases simply is the sum of the partial pressures of the individual components. Dalton's law is as follows:
$$P_\textrm{total} = P_1 + P_2 + P_3 + \cdots + P_n \equiv \sum_{i=1}^n P_i ,$$
and all component gases and the mixture are at the same temperature and volume
where P_{total} is the total pressure of the gas mixture
P_{i} is the partial pressure or pressure of the component gas at the given volume and temperature.
Amagat's law of partial volumes
This law states that the volume of a mixture of gases (or the volume of the container) simply is the sum of the partial volumes of the individual components. Amagat's law is as follows:
$$V_\textrm{total} = V_1 + V_2 + V_3 + \cdots + V_n \equiv \sum_{i=1}^n V_i ,$$
and all component gases and the mixture are at the same temperature and pressure
where V_{total} is the total volume of the gas mixture or the volume of the container,
V_{i} is the partial volume, or volume of the component gas at the given pressure and temperature.
Henry's law
This states that at constant temperature, the amount of a given gas dissolved in a given type and volume of liquid is directly proportional to the partial pressure of that gas in equilibrium with that liquid. The equation is as follows:
$$p = k_{\rm H}\, c$$
Real gas law
This was formulated by Johannes Diderik van der Waals in 1873. It is a modification of the ideal gas law that takes into account the space taken up by the particles themselves and the interactive forces between particles, which can change their trajectories (and therefore the pressure). It is most useful for gases which are far from ideal, i.e. gases with high pressures or low temperatures. The equation is as follows:
$$p = \frac{RT}{v-b}- \frac{a}{v^2}$$

or

$$(p+\frac{a}{v^2} )(v-b)=RT$$

where p is pressure, R is the universal gas constant, T is temperature in Kelvin, v is molar volume, i.e. volume divided by moles (V/N), and a and b are constant experimentally determined values dependent on the substance in question. b accounts for particle volume and a accounts for intermolecular forces.
