= Vegard's law =

Rule in materials science

In crystallography, materials science and metallurgy, Vegard's law is an empirical finding (heuristic approach) resembling the rule of mixtures. In 1921, Lars Vegard discovered that the lattice parameter of a solid solution of two constituents is approximately a weighted mean of the two constituents' lattice parameters at the same temperature:

$$a_{\mathrm{A}_{(1-x)}\mathrm{B}_{x}} = (1-x)\ a_\mathrm{A} + x\ a_\mathrm{B}$$

e.g., in the case of a mixed oxide of uranium and plutonium as used in the fabrication of MOX nuclear fuel:

$$a_\mathrm{U_{0.93}Pu_{0.07}O_{2}} = 0.93\ a_\mathrm{UO_2} + 0.07\ a_\mathrm{PuO_2}$$

Vegard's law assumes that both components A and B in their pure form (i.e., before mixing) have the same crystal structure. Here, a_{A_{(1-x)}B_{x}} is the lattice parameter of the solid solution, a_{A} and a_{B} are the lattice parameters of the pure constituents, and x is the molar fraction of B in the solid solution.

Vegard's law is seldom perfectly obeyed; often deviations from the linear behavior are observed. A detailed study of such deviations was conducted by King. However, it is often used in practice to obtain rough estimates when experimental data are not available for the lattice parameter for the system of interest.

For systems known to approximately obey Vegard's law, the approximation may also be used to estimate the composition of a solution from knowledge of its lattice parameters, which are easily obtained from diffraction data. For example, consider the semiconductor compound InP_{x}As_{(1-x)}. A relation exists between the constituent elements and their associated lattice parameters, a, such that:

$$a_{\mathrm{InP}_{x}\mathrm{As}_{(1-x)}} = x\ a_\mathrm{InP} + (1-x)\ a_\mathrm{InAs}$$

When variations in lattice parameters are very small across the entire composition range, Vegard's law becomes equivalent to Amagat's law.

== Relationship to band gaps in semiconductors ==
In many binary semiconducting systems, the band gap in semiconductors is approximately a linear function of the lattice parameter. Therefore, if the lattice parameter of a semiconducting system follows Vegard's law, one can also write a linear relationship between the band gap and composition. Using InP_{x}As_{(1-x)} as before, the band gap energy, $E_g$, can be written as:

$$E_{g,\mathrm{InPAs}} = x\ E_{g,\mathrm{InP}}+(1-x)\ E_{g,\mathrm{InAs}}$$

Sometimes, the linear interpolation between the band gap energies is not accurate enough, and a second term to account for the curvature of the band gap energies as a function of composition is added. This curvature correction is characterized by the bowing parameter, b:

$$E_{g,\mathrm{InPAs}} = x\ E_{g,\mathrm{InP}}+(1-x)\ E_{g,\mathrm{InAs}}-bx\ (1-x)$$

== Mineralogy ==
The following excerpt from Takashi Fujii (1960) summarises well the limits of Vegard’s law in the context of mineralogy and also makes the link with the Gladstone–Dale equation:

In mineralogy, the tacit assumption for the linear correlation of the density and the chemical composition of a solid solution is twofold: one is an ideal solid solution and the other identical or nearly identical molar volumes of the components. … Coefficients of thermal expansion and compressibilities of the ideal solid solution can be discussed in the same manner. But when the solid solution is ideal, the linear correlation of molar heat capacities and chemical composition is possible. The linear correlation of refractive index and chemical composition of an isotropic solid solution can be derived from the Gladstone–Dale equation, but it is required that the system must be ideal and the molar volumes of the components are equal or nearly equal. If the concept of the volume fraction is introduced, density, coefficient of thermal expansion, compressibility and refractive index can be correlated linearly with the volume fraction in an ideal system.“

== See also ==
When considering the empirical correlation of some physical properties and the chemical composition of solid compounds, other relationships, rules, or laws, also closely resembles Vegard's law, and in fact the more general rule of mixtures:

- Amagat's law
- Gladstone–Dale equation
- Kopp's law
- Kopp–Neumann law
- Rule of mixtures
