= Émile Amagat =

French physicist (1841–1915)

Émile Hilaire Amagat
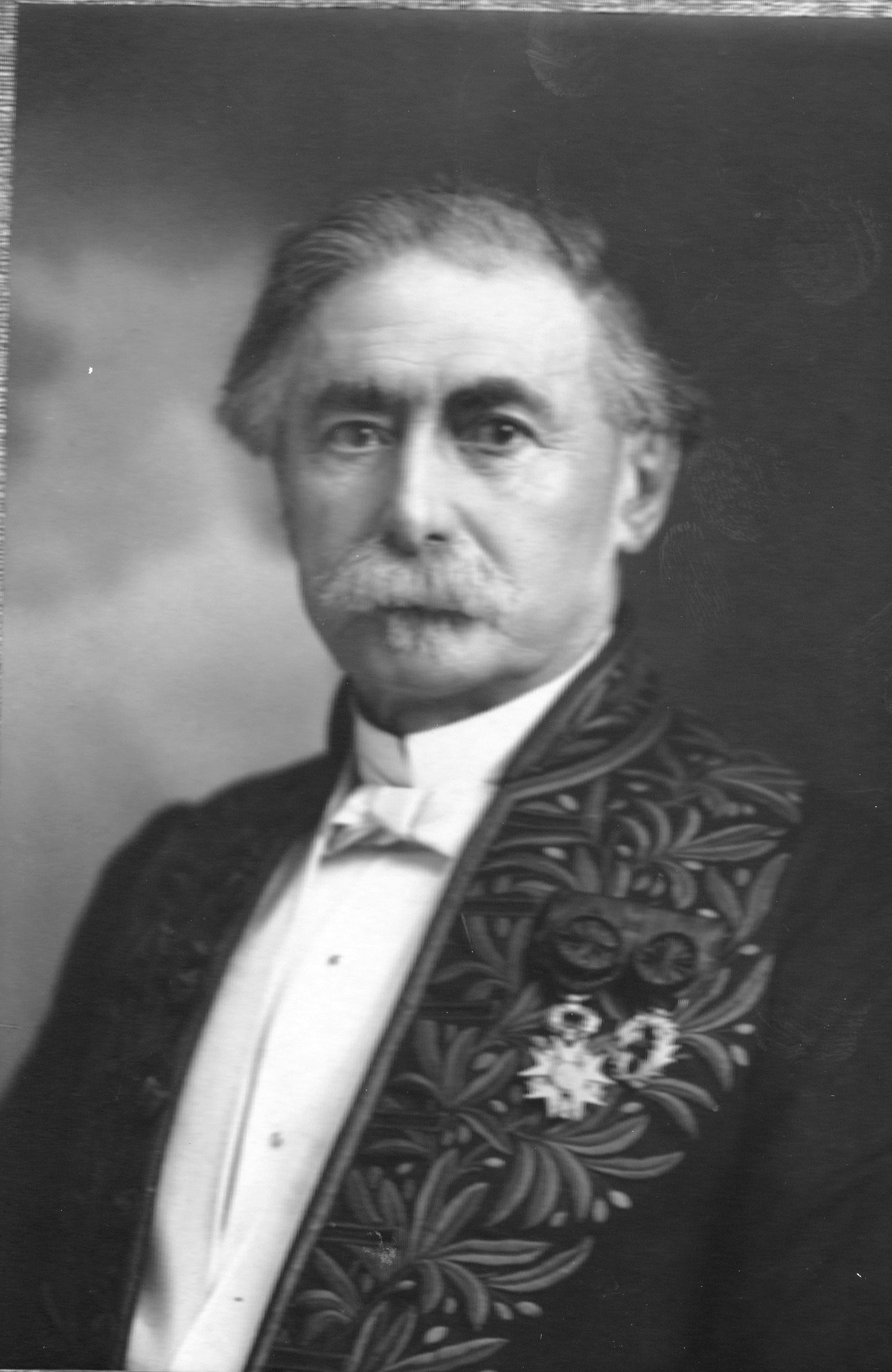
- Born: 2 January 1841; Saint-Satur, France
- Died: 15 February 1915 (aged 74); Saint-Satur, France
- Known for: Amagat's law, Hydraulic Manometer
- Scientific career
- Fields: Physics, Thermodynamics

Émile Hilaire Amagat (2 January 1841 in Saint-Satur – 15 February 1915) was a French physicist. His doctoral thesis, published in 1872, expanded on the work of Thomas Andrews, and included plots of the isotherms of carbon dioxide at high pressures. Amagat published a paper in 1877 that contradicted the current understanding at the time, concluding that the coefficient of compressibility of fluids decreased with increasing pressure. He continued to publish data on isotherms for a number of different gases between 1879 and 1882, and invented the hydraulic manometer, which was able to withstand up to 3200 atmospheres, as opposed to 400 atmospheres using a glass apparatus. In 1880 he published his law of partial volumes, now known as Amagat's law.

For his studies, he developed many original piezometer devices. To achieve high pressures, he first used a church tower for about 63 m of height, then a mine shaft at Verpilleux near Saint-Étienne for a 327 m mercury column, achieving ~430 atm, in order to study the equations of state of certain gases. His expertise led him to collaborate with the physicist Peter Tait in the development of a piezometer suitable for measuring the compressibility of liquids.

In 1886 he constructed a steel manometer that employed a reversed hydraulic press to generate the pressure. The high pressure was generated by a force pump and screw-driven plunger in a steel receiver. This pressure was then transmitted via liquid in a tube into the sample chamber containing the gas or liquid. The apparatus had a steel cylinder of about 3 cm internal diameter with a much larger steel jacket, and compression was continued by the screw device after initial pumping. To measure the pressure accurately, he used a double-headed free-piston manometer with the piston made gas-tight with viscous liquids such as molasses (for the small pistons) and castor oil (for the large pistons). Each free-piston has two heads. The small head has area $A_{small}$ is pressed against the higher pressure chamber with pressure $P_{high}$, and the large head has area $A_{large}$ pressed against another chamber with lower pressure $P_{low}$. The piston is balanced statically when $P_{high} = (A_{large}/A_{small})P_{low}$. By using pistons with $A_{large}/A_{small} \sim 500$, and measuring $P_{low}$ using a mercury column height manometer (up to 5.20 m), it was possible to measure pressures exceeding 3000 atm at an accuracy of ~1%.

Amagat was elected a member of the French Academy of Sciences on 9 June 1902. A unit of number density, amagat, was named after him. He was elected a foreign member of the Royal Society of London in 1897. E. F. Amagat, was elected to honorary membership of the Manchester Literary and Philosophical Society.

The French Academy of Sciences gave him the posthumous award of the Prix Jean Reynaud for 1915.

== In film ==
- In 2016 Polish film Marie Curie, Amagat was played by Daniel Olbrychski.
