= Helium atom =

Atom of helium

- Helium-4

Names
- Systematic IUPAC name Helium

Identifiers
CAS Number	7440-59-7
3D model (JSmol)	Interactive image
ChEBI	CHEBI:33681
ChemSpider	22423
EC Number	231-168-5
Gmelin Reference	16294
KEGG	D04420
MeSH	Helium
PubChem CID	23987
RTECS number	MH6520000
UNII	206GF3GB41
UN number	1046
- InChI: InChI=1S/He Key: SWQJXJOGLNCZEY-UHFFFAOYSA-N
- SMILES: [He]

Properties
Chemical formula	He
Molar mass	4.002602 g·mol^{−1}
Appearance	Colourless gas
Boiling point	−269 °C (−452.20 °F; 4.15 K)

Thermochemistry
Std molar entropy (S^{⦵}_{298})	126.151-126.155 J K^{−1} mol^{−1}

Pharmacology
ATC code	V03AN03 (WHO)
- Except where otherwise noted, data are given for materials in their standard state (at 25 °C [77 °F], 100 kPa). verify (what is ?) Infobox references

A helium atom is an atom of the chemical element helium. Helium is composed of two electrons bound by the electromagnetic force to a nucleus containing two protons along with two neutrons, depending on the isotope, held together by the strong force. Unlike for the hydrogen atom, a closed-form solution to the Schrödinger equation for the helium atom has not been found. However, various approximations, such as the Hartree–Fock method, can be used to estimate the ground state energy and wavefunction of the atom.

Historically, the first attempt to obtain the helium spectrum from quantum mechanics was done by Albrecht Unsöld in 1927. Egil Hylleraas obtained an accurate approximation in 1929. Its success was considered to be one of the earliest signs of validity of Schrödinger's wave mechanics.

== Introduction ==
Schematic termscheme for Para- and Orthohelium with one electron in ground state 1s and one excited electron.

The quantum mechanical description of the helium atom is of special interest, because it is the simplest multi-electron system and can be used to understand the concept of quantum entanglement. The Hamiltonian of helium, considered as a three-body system of two electrons and a nucleus and after separating out the centre-of-mass motion, can be written as
$$H(\mathbf{r}_1,\, \mathbf{r}_2) = \sum_{i=1,2}\left(-\frac{\hbar^2}{2\mu} \nabla^2_{r_i} -\frac{Ze^2}{4\pi\varepsilon_0 r_i}\right) - \frac{\hbar^2}{M} \nabla_{r_1} \cdot \nabla_{r_2} + \frac{e^2}{4\pi\varepsilon_0 r_{12}}$$

where $\mu = \frac{mM}{m+M}$ is the reduced mass of an electron with respect to the nucleus, $\mathbf{r}_1$ and $\mathbf{r}_2$ are the electron-nucleus distance vectors and $r_{12} = |\mathbf{r}_1 - \mathbf{r}_2|$. It operates in a 6-dimensional configuration space $(\mathbf{r}_1,\, \mathbf{r}_2)$. The nuclear charge, $Z$ is 2 for helium. In the approximation of an infinitely heavy nucleus, $M = \infty$ we have $\mu = m$ and the mass polarization term $\frac{\hbar^2}{M} \nabla_{r_1} \cdot \nabla_{r_2}$ disappears, so that in operator language, the Hamiltonian simplifies to:

$$H = \frac{1}{2m} \mathbf p_1^2 + \frac{1}{2m} \mathbf  p_2^2 - \frac{kZe^2}{ \mathbf r_1} - \frac{kZe^2}{ \mathbf r_2}+\frac{k e^2}{|\mathbf r_1-\mathbf r_2|}       .$$

The wavefunction belongs to the tensor product of combined spin states and combined spatial wavefunctions, and since this Hamiltonian only acts on spatial wavefunctions, we can neglect spin states until after solving the spatial wavefunction. This is possible since, for any general vector, one has that $|\Phi \rangle = \sum_{ij} c_{ij} |\varphi_i \rangle |\chi_j \rangle$ where $|\varphi_i \rangle$ is a combined spatial wavefunction and $|\chi_i \rangle$ is the combined spin component. The Hamiltonian operator, since it only acts on the spatial component, gives the eigenvector equation:

$$\begin{aligned}
H |\Phi  \rangle &= \sum_{ij} c_{ij} H |\varphi_i \rangle |\chi_j \rangle
\\&= \sum_{ij} c_{ij} (H| \varphi_i \rangle ) |\chi_j \rangle
\\&= E \sum_{ij} c_{ij} |\varphi_i \rangle |\chi_j \rangle
\\&=   \sum_{ij} c_{ij} E |\varphi_i \rangle |\chi_j \rangle,
\end{aligned}$$

which implies that one should find solutions for $H |\psi_j \rangle = E | \psi_j \rangle,$ where $| \psi_j \rangle =\sum_i c_{ij} | \varphi_i \rangle$ is a general combined spatial wavefunction. This energy, however, is not degenerate with multiplicity given by the dimension of the space of combined spin states because of a symmetrization postulate, which requires that physical solutions for identical fermions should be totally antisymmetric, imposing a restriction on the choice of $|\chi_i \rangle$ based on solutions $| \psi_i \rangle$. Hence the solutions are of the form: $|\psi_i \rangle| \chi_i \rangle$ where $| \psi_i \rangle$ is the energy eigenket spatial wavefunction and $|\chi_i \rangle$ is a spin wavefunction such that $|\psi_i \rangle| \chi_i \rangle$ is antisymmetric and $|\Phi \rangle$ is merely some superposition of these states.

Since the Hamiltonian is independent of spin, it commutes with all spin operators. Since it is also rotationally invariant, the total x, y or z component of angular momentum operator also commutes with the Hamiltonian. From these commutation relations, $S_{\pm}$ and $L_{\pm}$ also commutes with the Hamiltonian which implies that energy is independent of $m_l$ and $m_s$. Although the purely spatial form of the Hamiltonian implies that the energy is independent of $s$, this would only be true in the absence of symmetrization postulate. Due to the symmetrization postulate, the choice of $s$ will influence the type of wavefunction required by symmetrization postulate which would in turn influence the energy of the state.

Other operators that commute with the Hamiltonian are the spatial exchange operator and the parity operator. However a good combination of mutually commuting operators are: $L^2$, $L_z$, $S^2$, and $S_z$. Hence the final solutions are given as:

$$H | N, L, m_l, S, m_s \rangle = E_{nls} | N, L, m_l, S, m_s \rangle,$$

where the energy is $(2l+1) ( 2s + 1 )$ fold degenerate. For electrons, the total spin can have values of 0 or 1. A state with the quantum numbers: principal quantum number $n$, total spin $S$, angular quantum number $L$ and total angular momentum $J = |L-S|, \dots, L+S$ is denoted by $n^{2S+1}L_J.$

States corresponding to $S = 0$, are called parahelium (singlet state, so called as there exist $2s+1=1$ state) and $S = 1$ are called orthohelium (triplet state, so called as there exist $2s+1=3$ states). Since the spin exchange operator can be expressed in terms of dot product of spin vectors, eigenkets of spin exchange operators are also eigenkets of $S = (S_1 + S_2)^2$. Hence parahelium can also be said to be the spin anti-symmetric (spatially symmetric) state (singlet state) and orthohelium to be spin symmetric (spatially anti-symmetric) state (triplet state). Due to the Pauli exclusion principle, fermions (like electrons) requires antisymmetry under simultaneous exchange of spin and coordinates (totally antisymmetric wavefunction condition)
$$\boldsymbol \psi_{ij} (\mathbf{r}_1,\, \mathbf{r}_2) = - \boldsymbol \psi_{ji} (\mathbf{r}_2,\, \mathbf{r}_1).$$
Since the total wavefunction is antisymmetric, a symmetric spatial wavefunction can only be paired with antisymmetric spin wavefunction and vice versa. The singlet state is given as:
$$|\chi_{s=0,m=0} \rangle =  \frac 1{\sqrt 2} (|\uparrow\rangle |\downarrow \rangle- |\downarrow\rangle|\uparrow \rangle)$$
$$\psi(\mathbf r_1, \mathbf r_2) =\psi(\mathbf r_2\,,\mathbf r_1)$$

and triplet states are given as:
$$\begin{align}
&|\chi_{s=1,m=0} \rangle =   \frac 1{\sqrt 2} (|\uparrow\rangle|\downarrow \rangle+ |\downarrow\rangle|\uparrow\rangle)\; ; \\[4pt]
&|\chi_{s=1,m=1} \rangle = \;|\uparrow\rangle|\uparrow\rangle\; ; \;\;
|\chi_{s=1,m=-1} \rangle = \;|\downarrow\rangle|\downarrow \rangle \; .
\end{align}$$
$$\psi(\mathbf r_1, \mathbf r_2) = -\psi(\mathbf r_2 \,, \mathbf r_1)$$

as per anti-symmetrization and total spin number requirement. Hence orthohelium (triplet state) has a symmetric spin wavefunction but an antisymmetric spatial wavefunction and parahelium (singlet state) has an antisymmetric spin wavefunction but a symmetric spatial wavefunction. Hence the type of wavefunction of each state is given above. The $(2l+1)$ degeneracy solely comes from this spatial wavefunction. Note that for $l=0$, there is no degeneracy in spatial wavefunction. Also $\psi(\mathbf{r}_1,\mathbf{r}_2)=-\psi(\mathbf{r}_2,\mathbf{r}_1)\implies \psi(\mathbf{r},\mathbf{r})=0$, is a consequence of Pauli exclusion principle forbidding same spin indistinguishable fermions from also occupying same location.

Alternatively, a more generalized representation of the above can be provided without considering the spatial and spin parts separately. This method is useful in situations where such manipulation is not possible, however, it can be applied wherever needed. Since the spin part is tensor product of spin Hilbert vector spaces, its basis can be represented by tensor product of each of the set, $\{ |\uparrow\rangle_1 \,, |\downarrow\rangle_1 \}$ with each of the set, $\{ |\uparrow\rangle_2 \,, |\downarrow\rangle_2 \}$. Note that here $|\uparrow\rangle_1|\downarrow\rangle_2 \ne |\downarrow\rangle_1|\uparrow\rangle_2$ but are in fact orthogonal. In the considered approximation (Pauli approximation), the wave function can be represented as a second order spinor with 4 components $\psi_{ij}(\mathbf{r}_1,\, \mathbf{r}_2)$, where the indices $i,j = \,\uparrow,\downarrow$ describe the spin projection of both electrons in this coordinate system. The usual normalization condition, $\sum_{ij}\int d\mathbf{r}_1 d\mathbf{r}_2|\psi_{ij}|^2 = 1$, follows from the orthogonality of all $|i\rangle_1|j\rangle_2$ elements. This general spinor can be written as 2×2 matrix:

$$\boldsymbol \psi = \begin{pmatrix}\psi_{\uparrow\uparrow} & \psi_{\uparrow\downarrow} \\ \psi_{\downarrow\uparrow} & \psi_{\downarrow\downarrow} \end{pmatrix}$$

If the Hamiltonian had been spin dependent, we would not have been able to treat each these components independently as shown previously since the Hamiltonian need not act in the same manner for all four components.

The matrix can also be represented as a linear combination of any given basis of four orthogonal (in the vector-space of 2×2 matrices) constant matrices $\boldsymbol \sigma^i_k$ with scalar function coefficients $\phi^k_i (\mathbf{r}_1,\, \mathbf{r}_2)$ as $\boldsymbol \psi = \sum_{ik}\phi^k_i (\mathbf{r}_1,\, \mathbf{r}_2) \boldsymbol \sigma^i_k$.

A convenient basis consists of one anti-symmetric matrix (with total spin $S = 0$, corresponding to a singlet state)
$$\boldsymbol \sigma^0_0 = \frac 1{\sqrt 2} \begin{pmatrix}0 & 1\\ -1 & 0 \end{pmatrix} =  \frac 1{\sqrt 2} (\uparrow\downarrow - \downarrow\uparrow)$$
and three symmetric matrices (with total spin $S = 1$, corresponding to a triplet state)

$$\begin{align}
&\boldsymbol \sigma^1_0 = \frac 1{\sqrt 2} \begin{pmatrix}0 & 1\\ 1 & 0 \end{pmatrix} =   \frac 1{\sqrt 2} (\uparrow\downarrow + \downarrow\uparrow)\; ; \\[4pt]
&\boldsymbol \sigma^1_1 = \begin{pmatrix}1 & 0\\ 0 & 0 \end{pmatrix} = \;\uparrow\uparrow\; ; \;\;
\boldsymbol \sigma^1_{-1} = \begin{pmatrix}0 & 0\\ 0 & 1 \end{pmatrix} = \;\downarrow\downarrow \; .
\end{align}$$

It is easy to show, that the singlet state is invariant under all rotations (a scalar entity), while the triplet are spherical vector tensor representations of an ordinary space vector $(\sigma_x,\sigma_y,\sigma_z)$, with the three components:
$$\sigma_x = \frac 1{\sqrt 2} \begin{pmatrix}1 & 0\\ 0 & -1 \end{pmatrix} , \quad \sigma_y = \frac i{\sqrt 2} \begin{pmatrix}1 & 0\\ 0 & 1\end{pmatrix}, \quad \sigma_z = \frac 1{\sqrt 2} \begin{pmatrix}0 & 1\\ 1 & 0 \end{pmatrix} .$$
Since all spin interaction terms between the four components of $\boldsymbol \psi$ in the above (scalar) Hamiltonian are neglected (e.g. an external magnetic field, or relativistic effects, like angular momentum coupling), the four Schrödinger equations can be solved independently. This is identical to the previously discussed method of finding spatial wavefunction eigenstates independently of the spin states, here spatial wavefunctions of different spin states correspond to the different components of the matrix.

Parahelium is then the singlet state $\boldsymbol \phi = \psi_+ (\mathbf{r}_1,\, \mathbf{r}_2) \boldsymbol \sigma^0_0$ with a symmetric spatial function $\psi_+ (\mathbf{r}_1,\, \mathbf{r}_2) = \psi_+ (\mathbf{r}_2,\, \mathbf{r}_1)$ and orthohelium is the triplet state $\boldsymbol \phi_m = \psi_- (\mathbf{r}_1,\, \mathbf{r}_2)\boldsymbol \sigma^1_m,\; m =-1,0,1$ with an antisymmetric spatial function $\psi_-(\mathbf{r}_1,\, \mathbf{r}_2) = -\psi_- (\mathbf{r}_2,\, \mathbf{r}_1)$.

== Approximation methods ==
Following from the above approximation, effectively reducing three body problem to two body problem, we have:

$$H = \frac{1}{2m} \mathbf p_1^2 + \frac{1}{2m} \mathbf  p_2^2 - \frac{kZe^2}{ \mathbf r_1} - \frac{kZe^2}{ \mathbf r_2}+\frac{k e^2}{|\mathbf r_1-\mathbf r_2|}       .$$

This Hamiltonian for helium with two electrons can be written as a sum of two terms:
$$H = H_0 + H'$$

where the zero-order unperturbed Hamiltonian is

$$H_0 = \frac{1}{2m} \mathbf p_1^2 +\frac{1}{2m} \mathbf p_2^2  - \frac{kZe^2}{r_1} - \frac{kZe^2}{r_2}$$

while the perturbation term:
$$H' = \frac{k e^2}{|\mathbf r_1-\mathbf r_2|}$$

is the electron-electron interaction. H_{0} is just the sum of the two hydrogenic Hamiltonians:
$$H_0 = \frac{1}{2m} \mathbf p_1^2 +\frac{1}{2m} \mathbf p_2^2  - \frac{kZe^2}{r_1} - \frac{kZe^2}{r_2} = H_1 + H_2$$
where
$$H_i = \frac{1}{2m} \mathbf p_i^2  - \frac{kZe^2}{r_i}$$
are independent Coulomb field Hamiltonian of each electron. Since the unperturbed Hamiltonian is a sum of two independent Hamiltonians (i.e. are separable), the wavefunction must be of form $| \psi \rangle = |\psi_1 \rangle |\psi_2 \rangle$ where $| \psi_1 \rangle$ and $|\psi_2 \rangle$ are eigenkets of $H_1$ and $H_2$ respectively. However, the spatial wavefunction of the form $\psi(\mathbf r_1, \mathbf r_2) = \psi_a(\mathbf r_1) \psi_b(\mathbf r_2)$ need not correspond to physical states of identical electrons as per the symmetrization postulate. Thus, to obtain physical solutions symmetrization of the wavefunctions $| \psi_1 \rangle$ and $|\psi_2 \rangle$ is carried out.

The proper wave function then must be composed of the symmetric (+) and antisymmetric (−) linear combinations:
$$\psi_\pm^{(0)}(\mathbf r_1 \,, \mathbf r_2) =  \frac 1 {\sqrt 2}(\psi_a(\mathbf{r}_1) \psi_b(\mathbf{r}_2) \pm \psi_a(\mathbf{r}_2) \psi_b(\mathbf{r}_1))$$
or for the special cases of $\psi_a = \psi_b$ (both electrons have identical quantum numbers, parahelium only): $\psi_+^{(0)} = \psi_a(\mathbf{r}_1) \psi_a(\mathbf{r}_2)$.

This explains the absence of the $1^3 S_1$ state (with $\psi_a = \psi_b = \psi_{1s}$) for orthohelium, where consequently $2^3 S_1$ (with $\psi_a = \psi_{1s}, \psi_b = \psi_{2s}$) is the metastable ground state.

Note that all wavefunction obtained thus far cannot be separated into wavefunctions of each particle (even for electrons with identical $(n_1\,, l_1 \,, m_1 )$ and $(n_2\,, l_2 \,, m_2 )$ where wavefunction is $\psi^{(0)}(\mathbf{r}_1, \mathbf{r}_2) = \psi_{n_1,\ell_1,m_1}(\mathbf{r}_1) \psi_{n_2,\ell_2,m_2}(\mathbf{r}_2)$ because then, the spin of the electrons are in a superposition of different spin states: $|\uparrow\rangle|\downarrow\rangle$ and $|\downarrow\rangle|\uparrow\rangle$ from $\sigma^0_0$) i.e. the wavefunctions are always in superposition of some kind. In other words, one cannot completely determine states $(n\,, l \,, m_l \,, m_s)$ of particle 1 and 2, or measurements of all details, $(n\,, l \,, m_l \,, m_s)$ of each electrons cannot be made on one particle without affecting the other. This follows since the wavefunction is always a superposition of different states where each electron has unique $(n\,, l \,, m_l \,, m_s)$. This is in agreement with Pauli exclusion principle.

We can infer from these wavefunctions that $E= E_a+E_b$.

The corresponding energies are:
$$E^{(0)}_{n_1,n_2} = E_{n_1} + E_{n_2} = - \frac{kZ^2e^2}{2a_0} \left[\frac{1}{n_1^2} + \frac{1}{n_2^2} \right]$$

A good theoretical description of helium including the perturbation term can be obtained within the Hartree–Fock and Thomas–Fermi approximations (see below).

The Hartree–Fock method is used for a variety of atomic systems. However it is just an approximation, and there are more accurate and efficient methods used today to solve atomic systems. The "many-body problem" for helium and other few electron systems can be solved with high numerical accuracy. For example, the ground state energy of helium has been computed to 40 digits, −2.903724377034119598311159245194404446696925309 hartree, but the difference between the value and experiment is not understood.

=== Ground state of Helium: Perturbation method ===
Since ground state corresponds to (1,0,0) state, there can only be one representation of such wavefunction whose spatial wavefunction is:
$$\psi_0(r_1\,,  r_2) =\psi_{1,0,0}(r_1)  \psi_{1,0,0}(r_2) = \frac{Z^3}{\pi a_0^3} \mathrm{e}^{-\frac{Z(r_1 + r_2)}{a_0}}$$

We note that the ground state energy of unperturbed helium atom as:
$$E_0 = - 4 \frac{k e^2}{a_0} = -108.8 \text{ eV}$$
Which is 30% larger than experimental data.

We can find the first order correction in energy due to electron repulsion in Hamiltonian $\frac{k e^2}{|\mathbf r_1-\mathbf r_2|}$:
$$\Delta^{(1)}= \int \int \frac{Z^6}{\pi^2 a_0^6}\frac{ke^2}{|\mathbf r_1-\mathbf r_2|} e^{-\frac{2Z(r_1+r_2)}{a_0}} d^3\mathbf r_1 d^3\mathbf r_2 = \frac{5}{8} \frac{k Z e^2}{a_0}$$

The energy for ground state of helium in first order becomes $E \approx -74.8 \text{ eV}$ compared to its experimental value of −79.005154539(25) eV. A better approximation for ground state energy is obtained by choosing better trial wavefunction in variational method.

=== Screening effect ===
The energy that we obtained is too low because the repulsion term between the electrons was ignored, whose effect is to raise the energy levels. As Z gets bigger, our approach should yield better results, since the electron-electron repulsion term will get smaller.
$$\bar{H'} = \frac{ke^2}{r_{12}} - \frac{kZe^2}{r_1} -V(r_1) - \frac{kZe^2}{r_2} - V(r_2)$$
V(r) is a central potential which is chosen so that the effect of the perturbation $\bar{H'}$ is small. The net effect of each electron on the motion of the other one is to screen somewhat the charge of the nucleus, so a simple guess for V(r) is
$$V(r) = -\frac{k(Z-S)e^2}{r} = - \frac{kZ_\mathrm{e} e^2}{r}$$
where S is a screening constant and the quantity Z_{e} is the effective charge. The potential is a Coulomb interaction, so the corresponding individual electron energies are given by
$$E_0 = -\frac{k(Z-S)^2e^2}{2a_0n^2} = - \frac{kZ_\mathrm{e}^2e^2}{2a_0n^2}$$
and the corresponding spatial wave function is given by
$$\psi_0(r_1\,,  r_2) =\sqrt{\frac{Z_\mathrm{e}^3}{\pi a_0^3}} e^{-Z_\mathrm{e}(r_1 + r_2)}$$
If Z_{e} was 1.70, that would make the expression above for the ground state energy agree with the experimental value E_{0} = −2.903 a.u. of the ground state energy of helium. Since Z = 2 in this case, the screening constant is S = 0.30. For the ground state of helium, for the average shielding approximation, the screening effect of each electron on the other one is equivalent to about $\frac{1}{3}$ of the electric charge.

=== Ground state of Helium: The variational method ===
To obtain a more accurate energy the variational principle can be applied to the electron-electron potential V_{ee} using the wave function
$$\psi_0(\mathbf{r}_1,\, \mathbf{r}_2) = \frac{8}{\pi a^3} \text{e}^{-2(r_1+r_2)/a}$$
$$\langle H \rangle = 8E_1 + \langle V_\mathrm{ee} \rangle = 8E_1 + \left(\frac{e^2}{4\pi\varepsilon_0}\right) \left(\frac{8}{\pi a^3}\right)^2 \int \frac{\text{e}^{-4(r_1 + r_2)/a}} {|\mathbf{r}_1 - \mathbf{r}_2|}\, d^3\mathbf{r}_1 \, d^3\mathbf{r}_2$$

After integrating this, the result is:
$$\langle H \rangle = 8E_1 + \frac{5}{4a} \left(\frac{e^2}{4\pi\epsilon_0}\right) = 8E_1 - \frac{5}{2}E_1 = -109 + 34 = -75 \text{ eV}$$

This is closer to the experimental value, but if a better trial wave function is used, an even more accurate answer could be obtained. An ideal wave function would be one that doesn't ignore the influence of the other electron. In other words, each electron represents a cloud of negative charge which somewhat shields the nucleus so that the other electron actually sees an effective nuclear charge Z that is less than 2. A wave function of this type is given by:
$$\psi(\mathbf{r}_1, \mathbf{r}_2) = \frac{Z^3}{\pi a^3} \text{e}^{-Z(r_1+r_2)/a}$$

Treating Z as a variational parameter to minimize H. The Hamiltonian using the wave function above is given by:
$$\langle H \rangle = 2 Z^2 E_1 + 2(Z-2) \left(\frac{e^2}{4\pi\varepsilon_0}\right) \left\langle \frac{1}{r} \right\rangle + \left\langle V_\mathrm{ee} \right\rangle$$

After calculating the expectation value of $\frac{1}{r}$ and V_{ee} the expectation value of the Hamiltonian becomes:
$$\langle H \rangle = \left[-2Z^2 + \frac{27}{4}Z\right]E_1$$

The minimum value of Z needs to be calculated, so taking a derivative with respect to Z and setting the equation to 0 will give the minimum value of Z:
$$\frac{d}{dZ} \left(\left[-2Z^2 + \frac{27}{4}Z\right] E_1\right) = 0$$
$$Z = \frac{27}{16} \sim 1.69$$

This shows that the other electron somewhat shields the nucleus reducing the effective charge from 2 to 1.69. This result matches with experimental results closely as well as the calculations of effective Z in screening effect. Hence, we obtain the most accurate result yet:
$$\frac{1}{2} \left(\frac{3}{2}\right)^6 E_1 = -77.5 \text{ eV}$$

Where again, E_{1} represents the ionization energy of hydrogen.

=== Perturbation theory for Helium ===
Consider the same setting where unperturbed Hamiltonian is:
$$H_0 = -\frac{1}{2} \nabla_{r_1}^2 - \frac{1}{2} \nabla_{r_2}^2 - \frac{kZe^2}{r_1} - \frac{kZe^2}{r_2}$$
and perturbation is electron repulsion: $\frac{k e^2}{|\mathbf r_1-\mathbf r_2|}$.

In general, for (1s)(nl) state, in first order perturbation theory:
$$E = E_{100} + E_{nlm} + \Delta^{(1)}$$
with:
$$\Delta^{(1)}= I \pm J$$
where I is known as direct integral and J is known as exchange integral or exchange energy. If the combined spatial wavefunction is symmetric, its energy level has the + symbol in $\Delta^{(1)}$, whereas for the antisymmetric combined spatial wavefunction, $\Delta^{(1)}$ has a minus symbol. Since due to the symmetrization postulate, the combined spatial wavefunctions differ on symmetric or antisymmetric nature, the J term is responsible for the splitting of energy levels between ortho and para helium states.

They are calculated as:

$$I = \int \int |\psi_{100}(\mathbf r_1)|^2 |\psi_{nlm}(\mathbf r_2)|^2 \frac{ke^2}{|\mathbf r_1 - \mathbf r_2|} d^3\mathbf r_1 d^3\mathbf r_2$$
$$J = \int \int \psi_{100}(\mathbf r_1)\psi_{nlm}(\mathbf r_2) \frac{ke^2}{|\mathbf r_1 - \mathbf r_2|} \psi_{nlm}^{\text{*}}(\mathbf r_1)\psi_{100}^{\text{*}}(\mathbf r_2)  d^3\mathbf r_1 d^3\mathbf r_2$$
The first integral is said to be analogous to classical potential due to Coulomb interaction, where the squares of wavefunctions are interpreted as electron density. However, no such classical analog exists for the J term. Using Green's theorem, one can show that the J terms are always positive. From these, the diagram for energy level splitting can be roughly sketched. It also follows that for these states of helium, the energy of parallel spins cannot be more than that of antiparallel spins.

=== High precision theory ===
The Schrödinger equation for helium, like that of hydrogen, can be solved to accuracies equivalent to the most precise experimental values. Among the additional effects that must be included for these high accuracies include:

- mass polarization: the dynamics of nucleus around the atomic center of mass.
- relativity: Breit-Pauli corrections
- quantum electrodynamics effects: the Lamb shift due to electron interaction with vacuum fluctuations.

== Experimental value of ionization energy ==
Helium's first ionization energy is −24.587387936(25) eV. This value was measured experimentally. The theoretic value of Helium atom's second ionization energy is −54.41776311(2) eV. The total ground state energy of the helium atom is −79.005154539(25) eV, or −2.90338583(13) Atomic units a.u., which equals −5.80677166(26) Ry.

== See also ==
- Araki–Sucher correction
- Fermi heap and Fermi hole
- Isotopes of helium
- Hydrogen molecular ion
- Lithium atom
- List of quantum-mechanical systems with analytical solutions
- Quantum field theory
- Quantum states
- Spin isomers of hydrogen
- "Helium atom" on Wikiversity
