= Hydrogen anion =

Negative ion of hydrogen

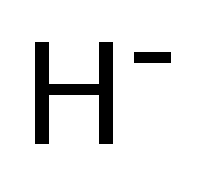

Names
- Systematic IUPAC name Hydride

Identifiers
CAS Number	12184-88-2
3D model (JSmol)	Interactive image
ChEBI	CHEBI:29239
ChemSpider	145831
Gmelin Reference	14911
PubChem CID	166653
CompTox Dashboard (EPA)	DTXSID6075306
- InChI: InChI=1S/H/q-1 Key: KLGZELKXQMTEMM-UHFFFAOYSA-N
- SMILES: [H-]

Properties
Chemical formula	H^{−}
Molar mass	1.009 g·mol^{−1}
Conjugate acid	Dihydrogen

Thermochemistry
Std molar entropy (S^{⦵}_{298})	108.96 J K^{−1} mol^{−1}
- Except where otherwise noted, data are given for materials in their standard state (at 25 °C [77 °F], 100 kPa). Infobox references

The hydrogen anion, H^{−}, is a negative ion of hydrogen, that is, a hydrogen atom that has captured an extra electron. The hydrogen anion is an important constituent of the atmosphere of stars, such as the Sun. In chemistry, this ion is called hydride. The ion has two electrons bound by the electromagnetic force to a nucleus containing one proton.

The binding energy of H^{−} equals the binding energy of an extra electron to a hydrogen atom, called electron affinity of hydrogen. It is measured to be 0.754195(19) eV or 0.02771616(70) hartree (see Electron affinity (data page)). The total ground state energy thus becomes −14.359888 eV.

By Lieb's inequality, H^{2−} has no bound state, so it does not exist.

== Occurrence ==
The hydrogen anion is the dominant bound-free opacity source at visible and near-infrared wavelengths in the atmospheres of stars like the Sun and cooler; its importance was first noted in the 1930s. The ion absorbs photons with energies in the range 0.75–4.0 eV, which ranges from the infrared into the visible spectrum. Most of the electrons in these negative ions come from the ionization of metals with low first ionization potentials, including the alkali metals and alkaline earths. The process which ejects the electron from the ion is properly called photodetachment rather than photoionization because the result is a neutral atom (rather than an ion) and a free electron.

H^{−} also occurs in the Earth's ionosphere and can be produced in particle accelerators.

Its existence was first proven theoretically by Hans Bethe in 1929, who used Hylleraas's variational method to show that H^{−} is bound. He estimated its ground-state energy as −1.0506 Ry (−0.5253 E_{h}), placing it below the hydrogen atom's ground state energy (−0.5 E_{h}). H^{−} is unusual because, in its free form, it has no bound excited states, as was finally proven in 1977.

In chemistry, hydrogen has the formal oxidation state −1 in the hydride anion.

The term hydride is probably most often used to describe compounds of hydrogen with other elements in which the hydrogen is in the formal −1 oxidation state. In most such compounds the bonding between the hydrogen and its nearest neighbor is covalent. An example of a hydride is the borohydride anion (BH^{−}_{4}).

== See also ==
- Hydron (hydrogen cation)
- Electride, another very simple anion
- Hydrogen ion
