= Lars Vegard =

Norwegian physicist (1880–1963)

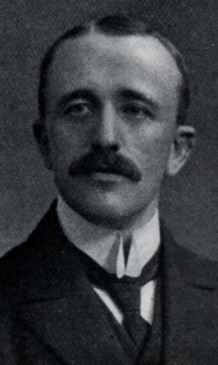
- Born: 3 February 1880; Vegaardsheien, Sweden-Norway
- Died: 21 December 1963 (aged 83); Oslo, Norway
- Citizenship: Norway
- Occupations: physicist, politician, professor
- Known for: Vegard's law
- Political party: Liberal Party
- Awards: Fridtjof Nansen Award of Excellence (1934); Order of St. Olav (1952)

Academic background
- Education: University of Oslo

Academic work
- Institutions: University of Oslo
- Doctoral students: Egil Hylleraas; Gotfred Kvifte

Lars Vegard (3 February 1880 – 21 December 1963) was a Norwegian physicist who is a pioneer in crystallography. He also made contributions to materials science and the science of aurora borealis. The Vegard's law in solid state chemistry and materials science, the only law of nature formulated by a Norwegian, is named after him.

== Education and scientific career ==
He was born in Vegaardsheien Municipality as a son of farmer Nils Gundersen Grasaasen (1840–1886) and Anne Grundesdatter Espeland (1839–1930). He attended middle school in Risør while his elder brother managed the farm after their father's early death and took the examen artium in Kristiania in 1899. He enrolled at the Royal Frederick University (now University of Oslo) and graduated with the cand. real. degree in 1905.

From 1906, Vegard worked as an assistant under Kristian Birkeland, researcher of the aurora and author of the Birkeland–Eyde process. In 1907 Birkeland helped Vegard to get a government stipend to study conduction of electricity in gases at the prestigious Cavendish Laboratory in Cambridge.

However, the Norwegian graduate student didn't work there on this topic, with a 1908 publication under the mentorship of J. J. Thomson covering osmosis. A year later he was recruited by William Henry Bragg, who was visiting Cambridge regularly, to study X-rays. Bragg, convinced they are corpuscular, was bothered by Charles Barkla's experiments on their polarization which proved their nature as electromagnetic waves. Vegard was able to successfully reproduce them.

British universities weren't awarding PhD degrees at the time, so in 1910 Vegard returned to Oslo and resumed the aurora research under Birkeland. In 1911 he managed to get another scholarship and go to the University of Würzburg to study anode rays, which were relevant to his hypothesis about positive ions in aurora, under Wilhelm Wien for another year. In 1912 he published “Über die Lichterzeugung in Glimmlicht und Kanalstrahlen” in Annalen der Physik, and this earned him the dr. philos. degree in 1913.

In Germany Vegard also heard Max von Laue's lecture proposing X-ray crystallography, appreciated it and wrote Bragg a detailed letter about the idea. During World War I the Norwegian, unlike his colleagues in continental Western Europe, was not bothered by any military work and was able to communicate with both German and British physicists, publishing his X-ray crystal lattice analyses (for example, of silver, gold, lead and zircon) both in Philosophical Magazine and in Physikalische Zeitschrift. Together with Schjelderup he also studied mixed crystals.

Vegard was a research fellow in physics from 1908 to 1910 and amanuensis from 1910 to 1913, both at the Royal Frederick University. He continued advancing at the university, and worked as a docent from 1913 to 1918 and professor from 1918 to 1952. He was also the dean of the Faculty of Mathematics and Natural Sciences from 1937 to 1941.

In 1939, Vegard proved hydrogen emissions in aurora borealis, and in 1948 he pointed out the doppler effect in hydrogen lines of aurora borealis. He penned about 100 academic publications, and was a board chairman of Det norske institutt for kosmisk fysikk from 1928 to 1935 and 1939 to 1955.

== Honors and awards ==
He was a member of the Norwegian Academy of Science and Letters from 1914, vice president of the International Union of Physics from 1932 to 1940, and a Commander of the Royal Norwegian Order of St. Olav.

== Political career ==
Vegard also had a political career, representing the Liberal Party in the municipal council of Aker Municipality from 1938 to 1945. He was married to consul's daughter Inger Hervora Petersen (1886–1961) from November 1915. He died in December 1963 in Oslo.

== See also ==
- Vegard's law
