= Laser polishing =

Laser polishing, also referred to as laser re-melting, is a type of micro-melting process employed for improving surface quality of materials. As opposed to other conventional polishing processes, this process does not involve removal of materials from the workpiece surface. In this process, the laser is made incident on the workpiece to melt the surface down to a certain depth, thus enabling subsequent betterment of surface parameters due to re-solidification of the melted material.

Laser Polishing can be done at two levels - micro and macro levels. The workpiece material can be any metal or metals alloys, and can also be used to polish certain ceramics and glass.

== Principle and mechanism ==
The aim of this process lies in melting a thin layer of the workpiece surface to reduce the average height of the peaks found on the surface asperities. The melting depth is strictly restricted to a certain degree of the asperity height to prevent any major microstructural changes deep in the workpiece material. This is hugely affected by the type of laser radiation, i.e. pulsed-radiation or continuous radiation, as well as the laser parameters, viz. laser power, feed rate or scanning velocity, laser beam diameter, and distance between source (or precisely laser focal point) and workpiece surface.

This process is widely researched for the application of surface reduction techniques on various materials. The two most general mechanisms are identified as Shallow Surface Melt (SSM) and Surface Over Melt (SOM).

=== Shallow Surface Melt (SSM) ===
Literature defines SSM region is formed due to dynamic behavior of the high-temperature metal liquid which is forced into micro-asperities essentially filling up the valleys present on the surface. The depth of the melted material is typically less than the peak-valley distance which can be affected by the laser parameters. The cited SEM image shows a clearly distinguishable laser polished surface without showing major side effects on the surrounding material, and can be used as a reference for understanding SSM mechanism.

=== Surface Over Melt (SOM) ===
Increasing the energy density of the laser beam after a certain level will change how the melt-pool, or the melted material will behave. With gradual increase in the melt-pool thickness, it will exceed the peak-valley distance (or the asperity height) thus converting the entire metal surface into a melt-pool. Higher densities of the laser causes the molten material to be pulled away from the solidifying front, thus forming ripples on the metal surface.

Thus, laser polishing with this mechanism requires extensive study of the effect of the laser parameters to reduce the waviness on the final polished surface.

== Mechanical properties of laser polished components ==
Since the workpiece surface is exposed to high temperature which establishes a huge thermal gradient along its cross-section, there are a few changes at the micro-structural level due to the material behavior at the surface. However, majority of the literature reports show little change in the overall material properties of the entire workpiece.

=== Surface morphology and microstructure ===
The laser polished surface has a huge improvement in terms of average surface roughness of the worked material. This can be attributed to uniform distribution of the melt-pool during rapid solidification, due to presence of laser pressure, gravity and surface tension. The treated layer is divided into 3 major zones: the re-melted layer, the heat affected zone and the original workpiece material. The near consistent re-melted layer has finer grains compared to rest of the material because of high cooling rate. This reduction in size from original can be explained as a result of grain boundary pinning due to presence of already present or fresh precipitates in the melted material. The fresh precipitates may sprout from the material matrix or maybe induced from surrounding environment.

Going down the material, there is the heat affected zone, which is not exposed to the laser beam, but is affected by the melt-pool formed on the surface. The grain sizes are coarser than the re-melted surface layer, but not as large as the original grain size that are found by going further down the material (typically in additively manufactured workpiece).

=== Tensile properties ===
The polished surface has a significant increase in tensile strength, but the total elongation (till failure) reduces. As a case study, consider a polymer-metal composite with aluminum fibers and PLA as the matrix. The cited study shows an increase in tensile strength from 41.01 MPa to 50.47 MPa with a reduced maximum elongation from an initial 60.6% to 33.2%. This can be explained as the result of densification and improved adhesion between the matrix and fiber components. The outcome therefore is increased rigidity and reduced ductility material at the polished surface.

For this specific case, the workpiece is fabricated with Fused Deposition Modelling (FDM), an additive manufacturing method. Typically, all the additively manufactured components have defects throughout their matrix, viz. gas porosity, gap between deposited layers, inconsistent lamination of the deposited layers and low adhesion among layers. All of the aforementioned terms have related or unrelated reasons of formation which can be studied in depth, but are beyond scope of this summary. These defects become the failure sources or origin of damage induced in the composite. Due to laser polishing, the failure behavior of the composite changes because of combined elastoplastic behavior of the newly polished fiber and matrix at the workpiece surface. Furthermore, since melted surface material flows from peak to unfilled valleys, many defects are removed. This also causes re-bonding of the matrix-matrix as well as matrix-fiber essentially improving the tensile strength as well as dynamic mechanical properties by creating a much denser structure.

This can be mathematically explained by rule of mixtures, by assuming constant strain for matrix and continuous fiber composite and evaluating the tensile strength for different stages found in a composite stress-strain curve

Other improvements can be seen on the polished surface are increased micro-hardness, wear resistance and corrosion resistance.

=== Fracture behavior ===
Depending on the material being polished the fracture mechanism vary vastly for pure metals, non-metals, alloys, polymers, ceramics, amorphous solids and composites. All of them show improved fracture resistance post laser polishing because of reduced defects and increased resistance to crack propagation. However, this performance is not universal, it is also affected by presence of defects within the unaffected workpiece material.

The improved fracture behavior can be quantified by defining the critical stress intensity factor ($K_c$). Theoretically, this value is achieved when the nominal applied stress is equal to the crack propagation stress, and is calculated taking into fact Griffith criteria. The final derived equation for a plane stress condition is given by a square root of product of the material stiffness ($E$) and the material toughness ( $G_c$). As evident, with increase in material stiffness, the polished surface is bound to have increased toughness.

A more in-depth study reveals role of more than just material stiffness in increase of the fracture resistance of the laser treated material. Multiple sources have described the effect of strain hardening (induced compression due to dislocation motion at elevated temperatures) and phase transformation within the material.

Consider another case study of a silicon nitride engineering ceramic. The result of this study documents the change in surface hardness, surface crack length and the surface $K_1c$ (mode-1 $K_c$) by using the Vickers indentation technique(s). The increase in surface hardness and $K_1c$ factor can be related to the induced residual compressive stress due to motion of dislocations at the elevated temperatures during the laser polishing process. These compressive stresses act against the externally applied tension, thus needing a certain threshold value in addition to the fracture stress (or crack propagation stress) to completely overcome the opposing stresses before crack initiation. Other observations include a reduction of crack length by 37% in the laser polished $\ce{Si3N4}$, and induced anisotopy, which is further discussed in the cited reference.
