= AlSi10Mg =

Type of aluminum alloy

AlSi10Mg is a lightweight, high-strength aluminium alloy that is widely used in the aerospace, automotive, and medical industries. Its unique combination of aluminium, silicon, and magnesium makes it an ideal material for additive manufacturing processes, such as 3D printing.

== Composition ==
The composition of AlSi10Mg typically consists of approximately 90% aluminium, 9% silicon, and 1% magnesium. The alloy may also contain small amounts of other elements, such as iron, copper, and zinc, to improve its mechanical properties and corrosion resistance. The precise composition of AlSi10Mg may vary depending on the specific manufacturing process used and the intended application of the alloy. However, the general proportions of aluminum, silicon, and magnesium remain consistent in most formulations of the alloy.

The addition of silicon to the alloy improves its strength and hardness, while magnesium enhances its ductility and corrosion resistance. The combination of these elements results in a material that is lightweight, strong, and resistant to corrosion, making it well-suited for a range of applications.

AlSi10Mg-0403 alloy is a specific type of AlSi10Mg that comprises aluminium alloyed with silicon of mass fraction up to 10%, small quantities of magnesium and iron, along with other minor elements. The presence of silicon makes the alloy both harder and stronger than pure aluminium due to the formation of Mg_{2}Si precipitate.

The chemical composition of AlSi10Mg is according to ASTM F3318, making it an essential aluminium alloy in additive manufacturing.

== Properties and applications ==
The history of AlSi10Mg dates back to the mid-20th century when aluminium alloys were being developed for various applications. The combination of aluminium, silicon, and magnesium was found to offer an ideal balance of strength, lightweight, and corrosion resistance. Today, AlSi10Mg is used in a wide range of industries, including automotive, medical, and defence. Its unique combination of properties makes it a versatile material that can be used for everything from lightweight structural components to heat sinks and electronic enclosures.

One of the primary advantages of AlSi10Mg is its high strength-to-weight ratio. This makes it an ideal material for producing lightweight components that require high strength, such as aircraft parts and automotive components. The alloy also has excellent thermal conductivity, which makes it useful for heat transfer applications, such as in heat sinks and cooling systems. The alloy's excellent strength-to-weight ratio and thermal conductivity made it a popular choice for aircraft components, such as engine parts, landing gear, and wing structures.

Another advantage of AlSi10Mg is its corrosion resistance. Aluminum naturally forms a thin oxide layer that protects it from corrosion, and the addition of silicon and magnesium further enhances this property. This makes AlSi10Mg an excellent choice for components that are exposed to harsh environments, such as marine or aerospace applications.

AlSi10Mg can be machined, spark-eroded, welded, micro shot-peened, polished, and coated if required. Conventionally cast components in this type of aluminium alloy are often heat treated to improve their properties. In addition, as technology continues to advance, it is likely that the use of AlSi10Mg will continue to grow and evolve. Ongoing research and development efforts are focused on improving the alloy's properties and exploring new applications.

=== 3D printing ===
In recent years, the development of additive manufacturing processes, such as 3D printing, has increased the use of AlSi10Mg. AlSi10Mg is well-suited for additive manufacturing processes such as selective laser melting (SLM) and electron beam melting (EBM). 3D printing with AlSi10Mg allows for the creation of complex geometries that would be difficult or impossible to produce using traditional manufacturing methods. The alloy's high strength and ductility also make it easy to work with during the printing process, allowing for the creation of high-quality, precise components.

=== Limitations ===
Despite its many advantages, there are some limitations to the use of AlSi10Mg. The alloy can be expensive compared to other aluminium alloys, and it requires specialised equipment and expertise to work with, which can add to the cost and complexity of production.
