= Joseph A. Mandarino =

- Born: April 20, 1929; Chicago, Illinois, United States
- Died: September 19, 2007 (aged 78); Toronto, Ontario, Canada
- Citizenship: United States (birthplace), Canada
- Education: University of Michigan
- Known for: Gladstone–Dale relation
- Spouse: Joan (née Cady) Mandarino

Joseph (Joe) Anthony Mandarino, FRSC (20 April 1929 in Chicago, Illinois – 19 September 2007) was an American-Canadian mineralogist and crystallographer.

== Early life and education ==
Joseph Anthony Mandarino was born into an Italian-American family on 20 April 1929 in Chicago, Illinois. He was the son of Bruno Mandarino and Rose (née Salvo) Mandarino.

Known for having a "wit as sharp as the crystals he studied" and a "biting sense of humour", he was not shy about speaking his mind and had little tolerance for sloppy work. However, he was always supportive of those who made efforts to contribute, whether professional or amateur. He would frequently speak at mineral clubs, do mineral identification for collectors, and served as the president of the Walker Mineralogical Club in Toronto. To encourage young people to study mineralogy, he established the Mandarino Prize, providing financial awards to undergraduate and graduate students for the best papers presented at the Rochester Mineralogical Symposium (RMS).

Mandarino's interest in minerals began when he was a child, collecting rocks around the Chicago area. Encouraged by one of his schoolteachers, he would make trips to see the mineral collection at the Field Museum of Natural History. By the age of 18, he had already published articles on minerals in Rocks and Minerals magazine.

Mandarino received his B.Sc. in 1950 and his M.Sc. in 1951 from Michigan Technological University in Houghton, Michigan. Following the completion of his studies at Michigan Tech, he worked as a mineralogist for the Allis-Chalmers Manufacturing Company in Milwaukee, Wisconsin. From 1952 until 1954, he served as a First Lieutenant in the United States Air Force, including a stint in Goose Bay, Labrador.

== Career ==
In 1957, he returned to Michigan Tech to take up a position as an assistant professor of mineralogy. He subsequently completed his Ph.D. at the University of Michigan at Ann Arbor in 1958.

The year after completing his Ph.D., he was hired as curator of mineralogy at the Royal Ontario Museum in Toronto. He ultimately became the curator-in-charge of mineralogy. In 1980, he voluntarily left to concentrate on research and teaching at the University of Toronto, where he worked until 1991. He returned to the museum as an acting associate director curatorial in 1990 and finally "retired" from the museum in 1994.

From 1968 to 1969, he was a senior research fellow of the National Research Council of Canada. He was the president of the Mineralogical Association of Canada (MAC) from 1973 to 1975. He was also a member of the Joint Committee on Powder Diffraction Standards. In 1983, he took over from Michael Fleischer as chairman of the Commission on New Minerals, Nomenclature and Classification (CNMNC) (formerly the Commission on New Minerals and Mineral Names (CNMMN)) of the International MineralogicalAssociation (IMA) until 1994,and was subsequently chairman emeritus until his death.

== Legacy ==
He is best known for co-creating, with Ernest Nickel, the IMA rules for the naming of new mineral species and for his further development of the Gladstone–Dale relation creating the "compatibility index" required under IMA rules for the approval of new mineral species. He also created the IMA "checklist" used by all mineralogists who wish to submit a new species for recognition. He wrote several books, many technical papers and popular articles on such topics as minerals that were first discovered in China.

He made 17 first descriptions of minerals, including barićite, denningite, hydroromarchite, keilite, kulanite, romarchite, marićite and walfordite. Through his work on setting the rules for IMA submissions, his influence on the naming of new species continues to this day.

== Honours ==
- The minerals mandarinoite (IMA1977-049) and telluromandarinoite (IMA2011-013) are named after him
- Fellow of the Royal Society of Canada
- Fellow of the Mineralogical Society of America
- Honorary Member of the Mineralogical Society of Great Britain and Ireland
- Honorary Director of the Canadian Gemmological Association
- Queen Elizabeth II Silver Jubilee Medal in 1977 (Canada)
- Hawley Medal in 1983 (Mineralogical Association of Canada)
- Sandor Koch Medal in 1996 (Hungarian Mineralogical Foundation) – its first recipient
- Berry Medal in 1999 (Mineralogical Association of Canada)
- Inducted in 2000 into the Academy of Geological and Mining Engineering and Sciences (Michigan Technological University)

== Selected publications ==
- Joseph A. Mandarino. (1981): Comments on the calculation of the density of minerals. Canadian Mineralogist Volume 19, pp. 531–534.
- Joseph A. Mandarino. (1981): The Gladstone–Dale relationship. IV. The compatibility concept and its application. Canadian Mineralogist Volume 19, pp. 441–450.
- Joseph A. Mandarino, Ernest H. Nickel, Fabian Cesbron. (1984): Rules of procedure of the Commission on New Minerals and Mineral Names, International Mineralogical Association. Canadian Mineralogist Volume 22, 367-368.
- Ernest H. Nickel, Joseph A. Mandarino. (1987): Procedures involving the IMA Commission on New Minerals and Mineral Names and guidelines on mineral nomenclature. Canadian Mineralogist Volume 25, pp. 353–377.
- Joseph A. Mandarino. (1987): The check-list for submission of proposals for new minerals to the Commission on New Minerals and Mineral Names, International Mineralogical Association. Canadian Mineralogist Volume 25, pp. 775–783.
- Joseph Anthony Mandarino, Violet Anderson. (1989): Monteregian Treasures: The Minerals of Mont Saint-Hilaire, Quebec. Press Syndicate of the University of Cambridge, UK.
- Joseph A. Mandarino, Jeffrey de Fourestier. (2005): Mineral species first found in the People's Republic of China. Rocks & Minerals Volume 80, Issue 2, pp. 114–117.
- Joseph A. Mandarino. (2007): The Gladstone-Dale compatibility of minerals and its use in selecting mineral species for further study. Canadian Mineralogist Volume 45, pp. 1307–1324.
