= Dalton's law =

Empirical law of partial pressures

An illustration of Dalton's law using the gases of air at sea level

Dalton's law (also called Dalton's law of partial pressures) states that in a mixture of non-reacting gases, the total pressure exerted is equal to the sum of the partial pressures of the individual gases. This empirical law was observed by John Dalton in 1801 and published in 1802. Dalton's law is related to the ideal gas laws.

== Formula ==
Mathematically, the pressure of a mixture of non-reactive gases can be defined as the summation:
$$p_\text{total} = \sum_{i=1}^n p_i = p_1+p_2+p_3+\cdots+p_n$$
where p_{1}, p_{2}, ..., p_{n} represent the partial pressures of each component.

$$p_{i} = p_\text{total} x_i$$
where x_{i} is the mole fraction of the ith component in the total mixture of n components.

== Volume-based concentration ==
The relationship below provides a way to determine the volume-based concentration of any individual gaseous component
$$p_i = p_\text{total} c_i$$
where c_{i} is the concentration of component i.

Dalton's law is not strictly followed by real gases, with the deviation increasing with pressure. Under such conditions, the volume occupied by the molecules becomes significant compared to the free space between them. In particular, the short average distances between molecules increases intermolecular forces between gas molecules enough to substantially change the pressure exerted by them, an effect not included in the ideal gas model.

== See also ==
- Amagat's law – Gas law describing volume of a gas mixture
- Boyle's law – Relation between gas pressure and volume
- Combined gas law – Combination of Charles', Boyle's and Gay-Lussac's gas laws
- Gay-Lussac's law – Relationship between pressure and temperature of a gas at constant volume
- Henry's law – Gas law regarding proportionality of dissolved gas
- Mole (unit) – SI unit of amount of substance
- Partial pressure – Pressure of a component gas in a mixture
- Raoult's law – Law of thermodynamics for vapour pressure of a mixture
- Vapor pressure – Pressure exerted by a vapor in thermodynamic equilibrium
