= Two-electron atom =

Helium-like quantum systems that have a nucleus and two electrons

In atomic physics, a two-electron atom or helium-like ion is a quantum mechanical system consisting of one nucleus with a charge of Ze and just two electrons. This is the first case of many-electron systems where the Pauli exclusion principle plays a central role.

It is an example of a three-body problem.

The first few two-electron atoms are:

Z = 1:	H^{−}	hydrogen anion
Z = 2:	He	helium atom
Z = 3:	Li^{+}	lithium ion
Z = 4:	Be^{2+}	beryllium ion
Z = 5:	B^{3+}	boron ion

== Schrödinger equation ==
The Schrödinger equation for any two-electron system, such as the neutral Helium atom (He, Z = 2), the negative Hydrogen ion (H^{−}, Z = 1), or the positive Lithium ion (Li^{+}, Z = 3) is: For a more rigorous mathematical derivation of the Schrödinger equation, see also.
$$E\psi = -\hbar^2\left[\frac{1}{2\mu}\left(\nabla_1^2 +\nabla_2^2 \right) + \frac{1}{M} \nabla_1 \cdot \nabla_2\right] \psi + \frac{e^2}{4\pi\varepsilon_0}\left[ \frac{1}{r_{12}} -Z\left( \frac{1}{r_1} + \frac{1}{r_2} \right) \right] \psi$$
where r_{1} is the position of one electron (r_{1} = |r_{1}| is its magnitude), r_{2} is the position of the other electron (r_{2} = |r_{2}| is the magnitude), r_{12} = |r_{12}| is the magnitude of the separation between them given by
$$|\mathbf{r}_{12}| = |\mathbf{r}_2 - \mathbf{r}_1 |$$
μ is the two-body reduced mass of an electron with respect to the nucleus of mass M
$$\mu = \frac{m_\text{e} M}{m_\text{e}+M}$$
and Z is the atomic number for the element (not a quantum number).

The cross-term of two Laplacians
$$\frac{1}{M}\nabla_1\cdot\nabla_2$$
is known as the mass polarization term, which arises due to the motion of atomic nuclei. The wavefunction is a function of the two electron's positions:
$$\psi = \psi(\mathbf{r}_1,\mathbf{r}_2)$$

There is no closed form solution for this equation.

== Spectrum ==
The optical spectrum of the two electron atom has two systems of lines. A para system of single lines, and an ortho system of triplets (closely spaced group of three lines). The energy levels in the atom for the single lines are indicated by ^{1}S_{0} ^{1}P_{1} ^{1}D_{2} ^{1}F_{3} etc., and for the triplets, some energy levels are split: ^{3}S_{1} ^{3}P_{2} ^{3}P_{1} ^{3}P_{0} ^{3}D_{3} ^{3}D_{2} ^{3}D_{1} ^{3}F_{4} ^{3}F_{3} ^{3}F_{2}. Alkaline earths and mercury also have spectra with similar features, due to the two outer valence electrons.

== See also ==
- Hydrogen-like atom
- Hydrogen molecular ion
- Helium atom
- Lithium atom
