= Olav Bø =

Norwegian folklorist (1918–1998)

- Born: 19 May 1918; Bygland Municipality, Norway
- Died: 26 July 1998 (aged 80)
- Occupation: Folklorist
- Awards: Order of St. Olav (1985)

Olav Bø (19 May 1918 – 26 July 1998) was a Norwegian folklorist. He was born in Bygland Municipality. Bø was appointed at the University of Oslo from 1956, as professor from 1974. Among his books are Norsk skitradisjon from 1966, Vår norske jul from 1970, and Trollmakter og godvette from 1987. He wrote a biography of cross-country skier and resistance member Johan Grøttumsbråten. He was decorated Knight, First Class of the Order of St. Olav in 1985.
