= Amagat's law =

Gas law describing volume of a gas mixture

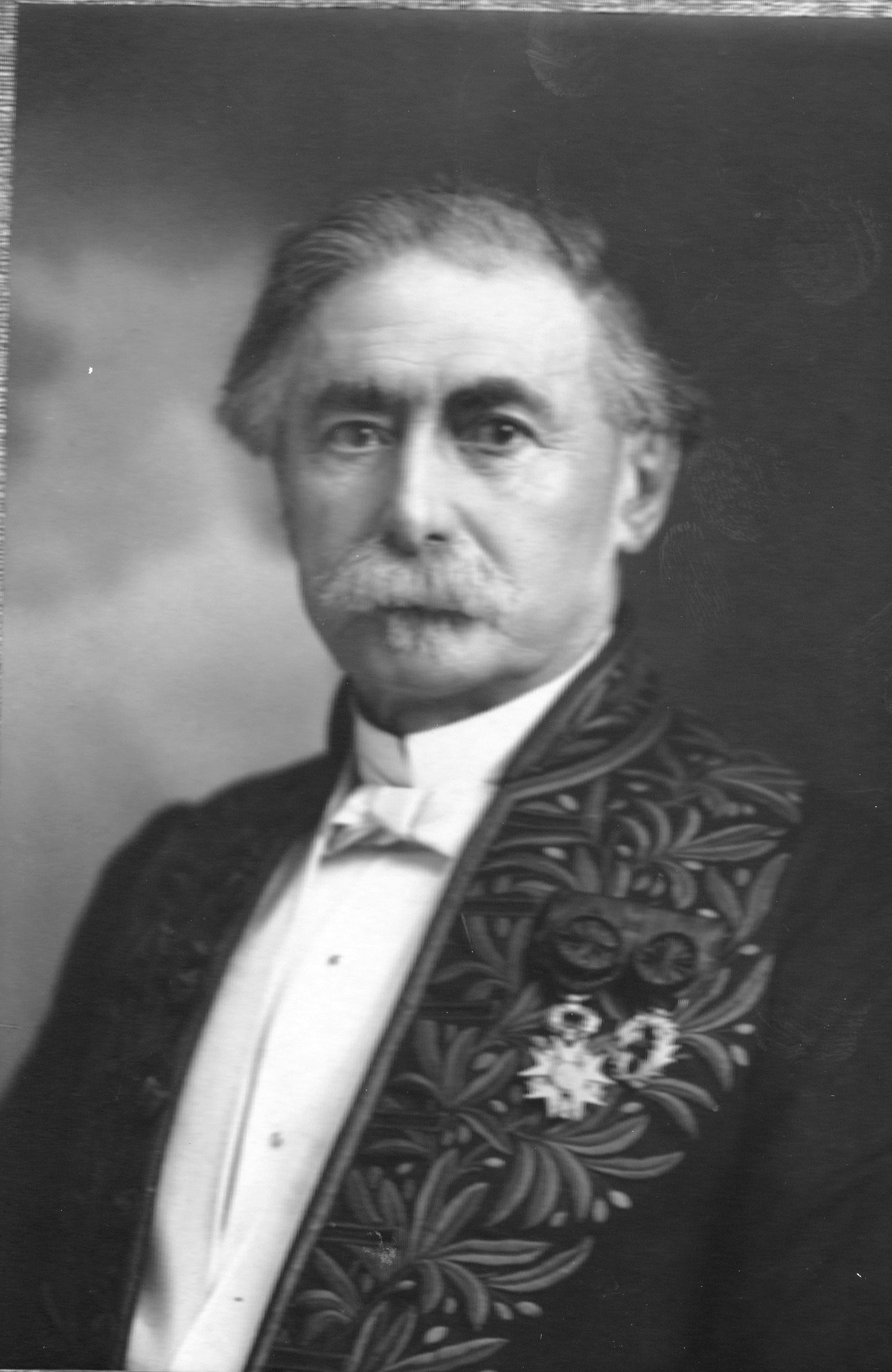
Emile-Hilaire Amagat, namesake of the law

Amagat's law or the law of partial volumes describes the behaviour and properties of mixtures of ideal (as well as some cases of non-ideal) gases. It is of use in chemistry and thermodynamics. It is named after Émile Amagat. Intuitively, it states that the volume of a mixture of ideal gases is the sum of the volumes of each component ideal gas in pure form.

== Overview ==
Amagat's law states that the extensive volume V = Nv of a gas mixture is equal to the sum of volumes V_{i} of the K component gases, if the temperature T and the pressure p remain the same:

$$N\, v(T, p) = \sum_{i=1}^K N_i\, v_i(T, p).$$

This is the experimental expression of volume as an extensive quantity.

According to Amagat's law of partial volume, the total volume of a non-reacting mixture of gases at constant temperature and pressure should be equal to the sum of the individual partial volumes of the constituent gases. So if $V_1, V_2, \dots, V_n$ are considered to be the partial volumes of components in the gaseous mixture, then the total volume V would be represented as

$$V = V_1 + V_2 + V_3 + \dots + V_n = \sum_i V_i.$$

Both Amagat's and Dalton's law predict the properties of gas mixtures. Their predictions are the same for ideal gases. However, for real (non-ideal) gases, the results differ. Dalton's law of partial pressures assumes that the gases in the mixture are non-interacting (with each other) and each gas independently applies its own pressure, the sum of which is the total pressure. Amagat's law assumes that the volumes of the component gases (again at the same temperature and pressure) are additive; the interactions of the different gases are the same as the average interactions of the components.

The interactions can be interpreted in terms of a second virial coefficient B(T) for the mixture. For two components, the second virial coefficient for the mixture can be expressed as

$$B(T) = X_1 B_1 + X_2 B_2 + X_1 X_2 B_{1,2},$$

where the subscripts refer to components 1 and 2, the X_{i} are the mole fractions, and the B_{i} are the second virial coefficients. The cross term B_{1,2} of the mixture is given by

$B_{1,2} = 0$ for Dalton's law

and

$B_{1,2} = \frac{B_1 + B_2}{2}$ for Amagat's law.

When the volumes of each component gas (same temperature and pressure) are very similar, then Amagat's law becomes mathematically equivalent to Vegard's law for solid mixtures.

== Ideal gas mixture ==
When Amagat's law is valid and the gas mixture is made of ideal gases,

$$\frac{V_i}{V} = \dfrac{\dfrac{n_i RT}{p}}{\dfrac{n RT}{p}} = \frac{n_i}{n} = x_i,$$

where:

$p$ is the pressure of the gas mixture,
$V_i = \frac{n_i RT}{p}$ is the volume of the i-th component of the gas mixture,
$V = \sum V_i$ is the total volume of the gas mixture,
$n_i$ is the amount of substance of i-th component of the gas mixture (in mol),
$n = \sum n_i$ is the total amount of substance of gas mixture (in mol),
$R$ is the ideal, or universal, gas constant, equal to the product of the Boltzmann constant and the Avogadro constant,
$T$ is the absolute temperature of the gas mixture (in K),
$x_i = \frac{n_i}{n}$ is the mole fraction of the i-th component of the gas mixture.

It follows that the mole fraction and volume fraction are the same. This is true also for other equation of state.

== See also ==
- List of eponymous laws
