= Gladstone–Dale relation =

Equation in optical analysis of liquids

The Gladstone–Dale relation is an empirical mathematical relation used for optical analysis of liquids, the determination of composition from optical measurements. It can also be used to calculate the density of a liquid for use in fluid dynamics (e.g., flow visualization). The relation has also been used to calculate refractive index of glass and minerals in optical mineralogy.

The relation is named after John Hall Gladstone and reverend Thomas Pelham Dale, who published first discussed it in 1863.

== Expression ==
In the Gladstone–Dale relation,
$$\frac{(n-1)}{\rho} = \sum km,$$

- n is the index of refraction of the mixture,
- ρ is the density of the mixture of miscible liquids,
- m is the mass fractions of each component molecule (summing to 1), and
- k is the specific refractivity of each component molecule (the light-bending ability for a given mass).

The Gladstone–Dale relation applies to any unit system, so long as ρ and k uses the same units. In SI units the most common option is g/cm^{3}.

k is also known as the Gladstone–Dale constant as it holds constant for each molecule regardless of changes to its density (e.g. due to temperature changes). Its unit is the inverse of the density unit, e.g. cm^{3}/g under the aforementioned choice of density unit. The same applies to mixtures of fixed composition, hence $\frac{(n-1)}{\rho}$ are also given this name. With real gases, changing the temperature will end up changing the proportion of chemical species within it, making the value not constant (e.g. by dissociation of O_{2} into oxygen atoms) - hence the other name, Gladstone-Dale coefficient.

== Examples ==
=== Alcohol and water ===
Consider a mixture of ethanol and water in a ratio of m ∶ (1 − m). Although the mass is conserved on mixing, the volume of ethanol-water mixtures is smaller than the total volume of the pure liquids due to the formation of ethanol-water bonds. If one plots the volume V against the ethanol fraction m, the result is a quadratic-like curve; the density ρ = 1/V is similarly a curve. However, the plot of the refractive index of the mixture n against m is linear.

=== Solids ===
In the 1900s, the Gladstone–Dale relation was applied to glass, synthetic crystals and minerals. Average values for the refractivity of oxides such as MgO or SiO_{2} give good to excellent agreement between the calculated and measured average indices of refraction of minerals. However, specific values of refractivity are required to deal with different structure-types, and the relation required modification to deal with structural polymorphs and the birefringence of anisotropic crystal structures.

In recent optical crystallography, Gladstone–Dale constants for the refractivity of ions were related to the inter-ionic distances and angles of the crystal structure. The ionic refractivity depends on 1/d^{2}, where d is the inter-ionic distance, indicating that a particle-like photon refracts locally due to the electrostatic Coulomb force between ions.

== Interpretation ==
The Gladstone–Dale relation can be expressed as an equation of state by re-arranging the terms to $n-1 = \rho \sum km$.

Gladstone–Dale turns the macroscopic values n and ρ determined on bulk material into a sum of atomic or molecular properties. Each molecule has a characteristic mass (due to the atomic weights of the elements) and atomic or molecular volume M that contributes to the bulk density and a characteristic refractivity k due to a characteristic electric structure that contributes to the net index of refraction.

The bulk index of refraction (n) is calculated from the change of angle of a collimated monochromatic beam of light from vacuum into liquid using Snell's law for refraction. Using the theory of light as an electromagnetic wave, light takes a straight-line path through water at reduced speed (v) and wavelength (λ). The ratio v/λ is a constant equal to the frequency (ν) of the light, as is the quantized (photon) energy using the Planck constant and E = hν. Compared to the constant speed of light in vacuum (c), the index of refraction of water is n = c/v.

The Gladstone–Dale term (n − 1) is the non-linear optical path length or time delay. Using Isaac Newton's theory of light as a stream of particles refracted locally by (electric) forces acting between atoms, the optic path length is due to refraction at constant speed by displacement about each atom. For light passing through 1 m of water with n = 1.33, light traveled an extra 0.33 m compared to light that traveled 1 m in a straight line in vacuum. As the speed of light is a ratio (distance per unit time in m/s), light also took an extra 0.33 s to travel through water compared to light traveling 1 s in vacuum.

The right-hand side of the expression thus describe how individual molecules contribute into the time delay. The discussion is simpler if we note that because $\sum m = 1$ and $\rho = \sum m/V$, $n-1 = (\sum km)/V$, with V being the volume of 1 unit mass of the mixture. This suggests that we are summing up the refractivity of the molecules, then distributing it over the total volume of the mixture. The Gladstone–Dale relation competes with the Kramers–Kronig relation and Lorentz–Lorenz relation but differs in optical theory.

In practical usage, specific refractivity k comes from a table. By using theories of electromagnetic waves not available to 1863, however, it can be shown that for any particle, $k = \frac{1}{2\epsilon_0}\frac{\alpha}{m}$, where ε_{0} is the vacuum permittivity, α is the polarizability, and m is the mass of a singular particle ($m = M/N_{\mathrm A}$ in the case of molecules, where M is the molar mass and N_{A} is the Avogadro constant). (The author also indicated specific assumptions and approximations used to arrive at the K-D relation.) (Relating k to other values can also be done via the molar refractivity $R_m$ as, by definition, $k = R_m/m = R_m N_{\mathrm A}/M$.)

== Compatibility index ==
Joseph A. Mandarino, in his review of the Gladstone–Dale relationship in minerals proposed the concept of the compatibility index (CI) in comparing the physical and optical properties of minerals. The CI measures the goodness of agreement between the measured physical properties (n and ρ, the latter being more commonly written as D in mineral literature) and the theoretical $\sum km$. This compatibility index is a required calculation for approval as a new mineral species (see IMA guidelines).

The CI is defined as ${\mathit CI} = 1 - \frac{K_p}{K_c}$, where:

- $K_p = (\bar{n} - 1)/D$, $\bar{n}$ being the mean refractive index;
  - There is a clear definition for how to calculate $\bar{n}$ from the different axes of n in anisotropic minerals. However, some sources claim to have measured $\bar{n}$ for such minerals, which is questionable because there's no standard method for doing so. From this difference, there is sometimes a so-called "measured K_{p}" versus "calculated K_{p}".
  - D is best calculated from unit-cell parameters and the empirical formula for older data entries.
- $K_c = \sum km$, more commonly written $K_c = \sum_i K_i W_i$ in geology. m (mass fraction, "weight percentage" in geology) is derived by chemical analysis. k is derived from earlier measurements that appear to be accurate so far.

CIs are divided into five ranks at 0.02, 0.04, 0.06, and 0.08 (2, 4, 6, 8% difference), called superior, excellent, good, fair, and poor, in both the positive and negative directions. Disagreements are suggestive of need for further study.

== Implication on the particle nature of light ==
The Gladstone–Dale relation requires a particle model of light because the continuous wave-front required by wave theory cannot be maintained if light encounters atoms or molecules that maintain a local electric structure with a characteristic refractivity. Similarly, the wave theory cannot explain the photoelectric effect or absorption by individual atoms and one requires a local particle of light (see Wave–particle duality).

A local model of light consistent with these electrostatic refraction calculations occurs if the electromagnetic energy is restricted to a finite region of space. An electric-charge monopole must occur perpendicular to dipole loops of magnetic flux, but if local mechanisms for propagation are required, a periodic oscillatory exchange of electromagnetic energy occurs with transient mass. In the same manner, a change of mass occurs as an electron binds to a proton. This local photon has zero rest mass and no net charge, but has wave properties with spin-1 symmetry on trace over time. In this modern version of Newton's corpuscular theory of light, the local photon acts as a probe of the molecular or crystal structure.
