= Dulong =

Dulong may refer to:

- Dulong people or Derung people, a Chinese ethnic group
- Dulong language, a Tibeto-Burman language in China
- Dulong, Queensland, a locality in the Sunshine Coast Region, Australia
- Dulong River in southeast Tibet

== People with the surname ==
- Pierre Louis Dulong (1785–1838)
- Søren Dulong Andreasen

== See also ==
- The Dulong–Petit law
