= Equipartition theorem =

Theorem in classical statistical mechanics

Thermal motion of an α-helical peptide. The jittery motion is random and complex, and the energy of any particular atom can fluctuate wildly. Nevertheless, the equipartition theorem allows the average kinetic energy of each atom to be computed, as well as the average potential energies of many vibrational modes. The grey, red and blue spheres represent atoms of carbon, oxygen and nitrogen, respectively; the smaller white spheres represent atoms of hydrogen.

In classical statistical mechanics, the equipartition theorem relates the temperature of a system to its average energies. The equipartition theorem is also known as the law of equipartition, equipartition of energy, or simply equipartition. The original idea of equipartition was that, in thermal equilibrium, energy is shared equally among all of its various forms; for example, the average kinetic energy per degree of freedom in translational motion of a molecule should equal that in rotational motion.

The equipartition theorem makes quantitative predictions. Like the virial theorem, it gives the total average kinetic and potential energies for a system at a given temperature, from which the system's heat capacity can be computed. However, equipartition also gives the average values of individual components of the energy, such as the kinetic energy of a particular particle or the potential energy of a single spring. For example, it predicts that every atom in a monatomic ideal gas has an average kinetic energy of 3/2k_{B}T in thermal equilibrium, where k_{B} is the Boltzmann constant and T is the (thermodynamic) temperature. More generally, equipartition can be applied to any classical system in thermal equilibrium, no matter how complicated. It can be used to derive the ideal gas law, and the Dulong–Petit law for the specific heat capacities of solids. The equipartition theorem can also be used to predict the properties of stars, even white dwarfs and neutron stars, since it holds even when relativistic effects are considered.

Although the equipartition theorem makes accurate predictions in certain conditions, it is inaccurate when quantum effects are significant, such as at low temperatures. When the thermal energy k_{B}T is smaller than the quantum energy spacing in a particular degree of freedom, the average energy and heat capacity of this degree of freedom are less than the values predicted by equipartition. Such a degree of freedom is said to be "frozen out" when the thermal energy is much smaller than this spacing. For example, the heat capacity of a solid decreases at low temperatures as various types of motion become frozen out, rather than remaining constant as predicted by equipartition. Such decreases in heat capacity were among the first signs to physicists of the 19th century that classical physics was incorrect and that a new, more subtle, scientific model was required. Along with other evidence, equipartition's failure to model black-body radiation—also known as the ultraviolet catastrophe—led Max Planck to suggest that energy in the oscillators in an object, which emit light, were quantized, a revolutionary hypothesis that spurred the development of quantum mechanics and quantum field theory.

== Basic concept and simple examples ==
Figure 2. Probability density functions of the molecular speed for four noble gases at a temperature of 298.15 K (25 °C). The four gases are helium (^{4}He), neon (^{20}Ne), argon (^{40}Ar) and xenon (^{132}Xe); the superscripts indicate their mass numbers. These probability density functions have dimensions of probability times inverse speed; since probability is dimensionless, they can be expressed in units of seconds per meter.

The name "equipartition" means "equal division," as derived from the Latin equi from the antecedent, æquus ("equal or even"), and partition from the noun, partitio ("division, portion"). The original concept of equipartition was that the total kinetic energy of a system is shared equally among all of its independent parts, on the average, once the system has reached thermal equilibrium. Equipartition also makes quantitative predictions for these energies. For example, it predicts that every atom of an inert noble gas, in thermal equilibrium at temperature T, has an average translational kinetic energy of 3/2k_{B}T, where k_{B} is the Boltzmann constant. As a consequence, since kinetic energy is equal to 1/2(mass)(velocity)^{2}, the heavier atoms of xenon have a lower average speed than do the lighter atoms of helium at the same temperature. Figure 2 shows the Maxwell–Boltzmann distribution for the speeds of the atoms in four noble gases.

In this example, the key point is that the kinetic energy is quadratic in the velocity. The equipartition theorem shows that in thermal equilibrium, any degree of freedom (such as a component of the position or velocity of a particle) which appears only quadratically in the energy has an average energy of 1/2k_{B}T and therefore contributes 1/2k_{B} to the system's heat capacity. This has many applications.

=== Translational energy and ideal gases ===
The (Newtonian) kinetic energy of a particle of mass m, velocity v is given by
$$H_{\text{kin}} = \tfrac 1 2 m |\mathbf{v}|^2 = \tfrac{1}{2} m\left( v_x^2 + v_y^2 + v_z^2 \right),$$
where v_{x}, v_{y} and v_{z} are the Cartesian components of the velocity v. Here, H is short for Hamiltonian, and used henceforth as a symbol for energy because the Hamiltonian formalism plays a central role in the most general form of the equipartition theorem.

Since the kinetic energy is quadratic in the components of the velocity, by equipartition these three components each contribute 1/2k_{B}T to the average kinetic energy in thermal equilibrium. Thus the average kinetic energy of the particle is 3/2k_{B}T, as in the example of noble gases above.

More generally, in a monatomic ideal gas the total energy consists purely of (translational) kinetic energy: by assumption, the particles have no internal degrees of freedom and move independently of one another. Equipartition therefore predicts that the total energy of an ideal gas of N particles is 3/2 N k_{B} T.

It follows that the heat capacity of the gas is 3/2 N k_{B} and hence, in particular, the heat capacity of a mole of such gas particles is 3/2N_{A}k_{B} = 3/2R, where N_{A} is the Avogadro constant and R is the gas constant. Since R ≈ 2 cal/(mol·K), equipartition predicts that the molar heat capacity of an ideal gas is roughly 3 cal/(mol·K). This prediction is confirmed by experiment when compared to monatomic gases.

The mean kinetic energy also allows the root mean square speed v_{rms} of the gas particles to be calculated:
$$v_{\text{rms}} = \sqrt{\left\langle v^2 \right\rangle} = \sqrt{\frac{3 k_\text{B} T}{m}} = \sqrt{\frac{3 R T}{M}},$$
where M = N_{A}m is the mass of a mole of gas particles. This result is useful for many applications such as Graham's law of effusion, which provides a method for enriching uranium.

=== Rotational energy and molecular tumbling in solution ===
A similar example is provided by a rotating molecule with principal moments of inertia I_{1}, I_{2} and I_{3}. According to classical mechanics, the rotational energy of such a molecule is given by
$$H_{\mathrm{rot}} = \tfrac{1}{2} ( I_1 \omega_1^2 + I_2 \omega_2^2 + I_3 \omega_3^2 ),$$
where ω_{1}, ω_{2}, and ω_{3} are the principal components of the angular velocity. By exactly the same reasoning as in the translational case, equipartition implies that in thermal equilibrium the average rotational energy of each particle is 3/2k_{B}T. Similarly, the equipartition theorem allows the average (more precisely, the root mean square) angular speed of the molecules to be calculated.

The tumbling of rigid molecules—that is, the random rotations of molecules in solution—plays a key role in the relaxations observed by nuclear magnetic resonance, particularly protein NMR and residual dipolar couplings. Rotational diffusion can also be observed by other biophysical probes such as fluorescence anisotropy, flow birefringence and dielectric spectroscopy.

=== Potential energy and harmonic oscillators ===
Equipartition applies to potential energies as well as kinetic energies: important examples include harmonic oscillators such as a spring, which has a quadratic potential energy
$$H_{\text{pot}} = \tfrac 1 2 a q^2,\,$$
where the constant a describes the stiffness of the spring and q is the deviation from equilibrium. If such a one-dimensional system has mass m, then its kinetic energy H_{kin} is
$$H_{\text{kin}} = \frac{1}{2}mv^2 = \frac{p^2}{2m},$$
where v and p = mv denote the velocity and momentum of the oscillator. Combining these terms yields the total energy
$$H = H_{\text{kin}} + H_{\text{pot}} = \frac{p^2}{2m} + \frac{1}{2} a q^2.$$
Equipartition therefore implies that in thermal equilibrium, the oscillator has average energy
$$\langle H \rangle =
\langle H_{\text{kin}} \rangle + \langle H_{\text{pot}} \rangle =
\tfrac{1}{2} k_\text{B} T + \tfrac{1}{2} k_\text{B} T = k_\text{B} T,$$
where the angular brackets $\left\langle \ldots \right\rangle$ denote the average of the enclosed quantity,

This result is valid for any type of harmonic oscillator, such as a pendulum, a vibrating molecule or a passive electronic oscillator. Systems of such oscillators arise in many situations; by equipartition, each such oscillator receives an average total energy k_{B}T and hence contributes k_{B} to the system's heat capacity. This can be used to derive the formula for Johnson–Nyquist noise and the Dulong–Petit law of solid heat capacities. The latter application was particularly significant in the history of equipartition.

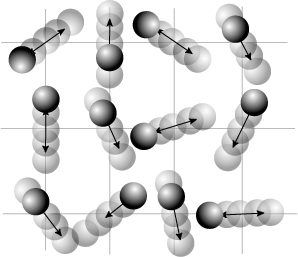
Figure 3. Atoms in a crystal can vibrate about their equilibrium positions in the lattice. Such vibrations account largely for the heat capacity of crystalline dielectrics; with metals, electrons also contribute to the heat capacity.

=== Specific heat capacity of solids ===
An important application of the equipartition theorem is to the specific heat capacity of a crystalline solid. Each atom in such a solid can oscillate in three independent directions, so the solid can be viewed as a system of 3N independent simple harmonic oscillators, where N denotes the number of atoms in the lattice. Since each harmonic oscillator has average energy k_{B}T, the average total energy of the solid is 3N k_{B}T, and its heat capacity is 3N k_{B}.

By taking N to be the Avogadro constant N_{A}, and using the relation R = N_{A}k_{B} between the gas constant R and the Boltzmann constant k_{B}, this provides an explanation for the Dulong–Petit law of specific heat capacities of solids, which stated that the specific heat capacity (per unit mass) of a solid element is inversely proportional to its atomic weight. A modern version is that the molar heat capacity of a solid is 3R ≈ 6 cal/(mol·K).

However, this law is inaccurate at lower temperatures, due to quantum effects; it is also inconsistent with the experimentally derived third law of thermodynamics, according to which the molar heat capacity of any substance must go to zero as the temperature goes to absolute zero. A more accurate theory, incorporating quantum effects, was developed by Albert Einstein (1907) and Peter Debye (1911).

Many other physical systems can be modeled as sets of coupled oscillators. The motions of such oscillators can be decomposed into normal modes, like the vibrational modes of a piano string or the resonances of an organ pipe. On the other hand, equipartition often breaks down for such systems, because there is no exchange of energy between the normal modes. In an extreme situation, the modes are independent and so their energies are independently conserved. This shows that some sort of mixing of energies, formally called ergodicity, is important for the law of equipartition to hold.

=== Sedimentation of particles ===
Potential energies are not always quadratic in the position. However, the equipartition theorem also shows that if a degree of freedom x contributes only a multiple of x^{s} (for a fixed real number s) to the energy, then in thermal equilibrium the average energy of that part is k_{B}T/s.

There is a simple application of this extension to the sedimentation of particles under gravity. For example, the haze sometimes seen in beer can be caused by clumps of proteins that scatter light. Over time, these clumps settle downwards under the influence of gravity, causing more haze near the bottom of a bottle than near its top. However, in a process working in the opposite direction, the particles also diffuse back up towards the top of the bottle. Once equilibrium has been reached, the equipartition theorem may be used to determine the average position of a particular clump of buoyant mass m_{b}. For an infinitely tall bottle of beer, the gravitational potential energy is given by
$$H^{\mathrm{grav}} = m_\text{b} g z$$
where z is the height of the protein clump in the bottle and g is the acceleration due to gravity. Since s = 1, the average potential energy of a protein clump equals k_{B}T. Hence, a protein clump with a buoyant mass of 10 MDa (roughly the size of a virus) would produce a haze with an average height of about 2 cm at equilibrium. The process of such sedimentation to equilibrium is described by the Mason–Weaver equation.

== History ==
The equipartition of kinetic energy was proposed initially in 1843, and more correctly in 1845, by John James Waterston. In 1859, James Clerk Maxwell argued that the kinetic heat energy of a gas is equally divided between linear and rotational energy. In 1876, Ludwig Boltzmann expanded on this principle by showing that the average energy was divided equally among all the independent components of motion in a system. Boltzmann applied the equipartition theorem to provide a theoretical explanation of the Dulong–Petit law for the specific heat capacities of solids.

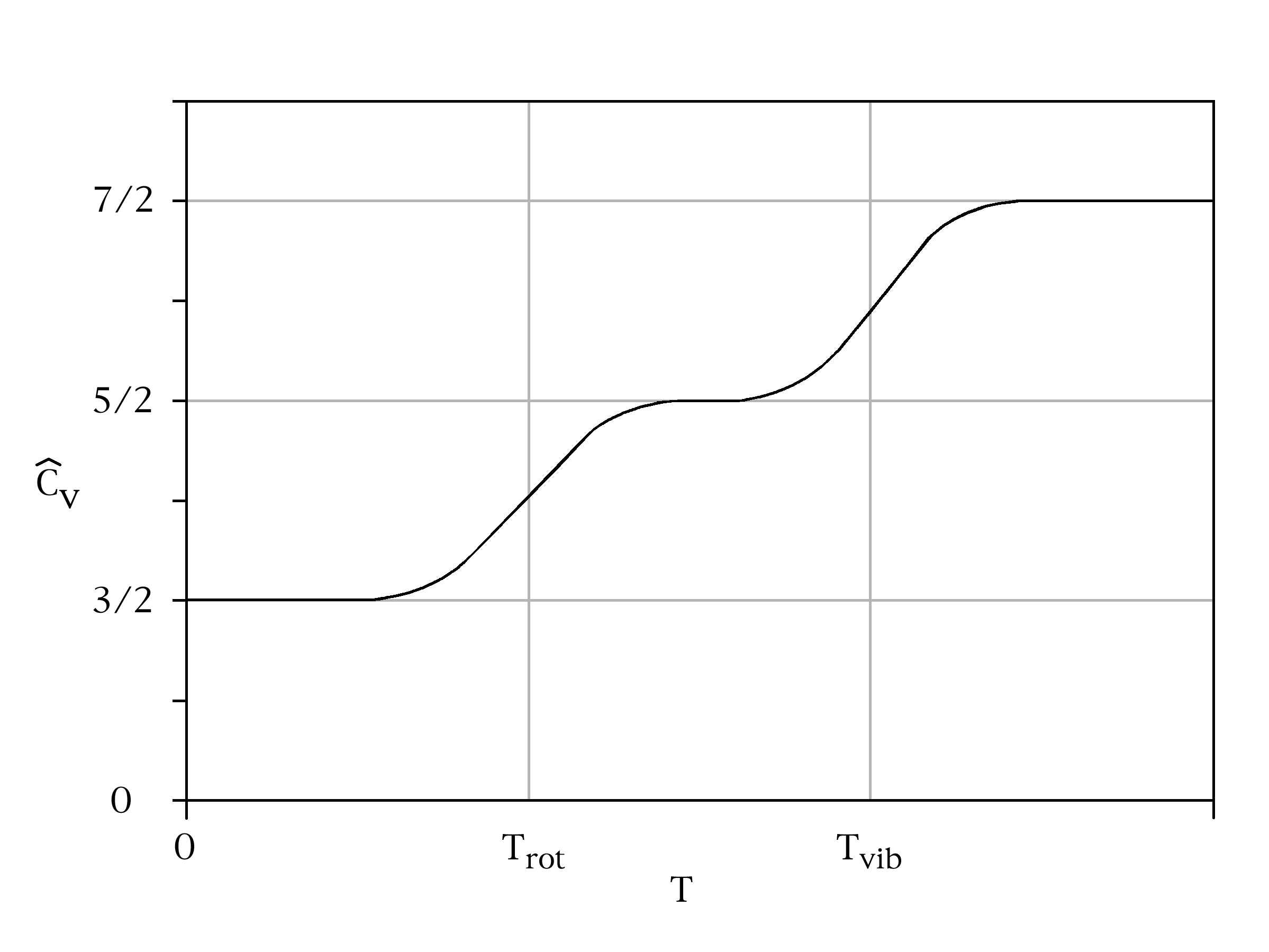
Figure 4. Idealized plot of the molar specific heat of a diatomic gas against temperature. It agrees with the value (7/2)R predicted by equipartition at high temperatures (where R is the gas constant), but decreases to (5/2)R and then 3/2R at lower temperatures, as the vibrational and rotational modes of motion are "frozen out". The failure of the equipartition theorem led to a paradox that was only resolved by quantum mechanics. For most molecules, the transitional temperature T_{rot} is much less than room temperature, whereas T_{vib} can be ten times larger or more. A typical example is carbon monoxide, CO, for which T_{rot} ≈ 2.8 K and T_{vib} ≈ 3103 K. For molecules with very large or weakly bound atoms, T_{vib} can be close to room temperature (about 300 K); for example, T_{vib} ≈ 308 K for iodine gas, I_{2}.

The history of the equipartition theorem is intertwined with that of specific heat capacity, both of which were studied in the 19th century. In 1819, the French physicists Pierre Louis Dulong and Alexis Thérèse Petit discovered that the specific heat capacities of solid elements at room temperature were inversely proportional to the atomic weight of the element. Their law was used for many years as a technique for measuring atomic weights. However, subsequent studies by James Dewar and Heinrich Friedrich Weber showed that this Dulong–Petit law holds only at high temperatures; at lower temperatures, or for exceptionally hard solids such as diamond, the specific heat capacity was lower.

Experimental observations of the specific heat capacities of gases also raised concerns about the validity of the equipartition theorem. The theorem predicts that the molar heat capacity of simple monatomic gases should be roughly 3 cal/(mol·K), whereas that of diatomic gases should be roughly 7 cal/(mol·K). Experiments confirmed the former prediction, but found that molar heat capacities of diatomic gases were typically about 5 cal/(mol·K), and fell to about 3 cal/(mol·K) at very low temperatures. Maxwell noted in 1875 that the disagreement between experiment and the equipartition theorem was much worse than even these numbers suggest; since atoms have internal parts, heat energy should go into the motion of these internal parts, making the predicted specific heats of monatomic and diatomic gases much higher than 3 cal/(mol·K) and 7 cal/(mol·K), respectively.

A third discrepancy concerned the specific heat of metals. According to the classical Drude model, metallic electrons act as a nearly ideal gas, and so they should contribute 3/2 N_{e}k_{B} to the heat capacity by the equipartition theorem, where N_{e} is the number of electrons. Experimentally, however, electrons contribute little to the heat capacity: the molar heat capacities of many conductors and insulators are nearly the same.

Several explanations of equipartition's failure to account for molar heat capacities were proposed. Boltzmann defended the derivation of his equipartition theorem as correct, but suggested that gases might not be in thermal equilibrium because of their interactions with the aether. Lord Kelvin suggested that the derivation of the equipartition theorem must be incorrect, since it disagreed with experiment, but was unable to show how. In 1900 Lord Rayleigh instead put forward a more radical view that the equipartition theorem and the experimental assumption of thermal equilibrium were both correct; to reconcile them, he noted the need for a new principle that would provide an "escape from the destructive simplicity" of the equipartition theorem. Albert Einstein provided that escape, by showing in 1906 that these anomalies in the specific heat were due to quantum effects, specifically the quantization of energy in the elastic modes of the solid. Einstein used the failure of equipartition to argue for the need of a new quantum theory of matter. Nernst's 1910 measurements of specific heats at low temperatures supported Einstein's theory, and led to the widespread acceptance of quantum theory among physicists.

== General formulation of the equipartition theorem ==
The most general form of the equipartition theorem states that under suitable assumptions (discussed below), for a physical system with Hamiltonian energy function H and degrees of freedom x_{n}, the following equipartition formula holds in thermal equilibrium for all indices m and n:
$$\left\langle x_{m} \frac{\partial H}{\partial x_{n}} \right\rangle = \delta_{mn} k_\text{B} T.$$
Here δ_{mn} is the Kronecker delta, which is equal to one if m = n and is zero otherwise. The averaging brackets $\left\langle \ldots \right\rangle$ is assumed to be an ensemble average over phase space or, under an assumption of ergodicity, a time average of a single system.

The general equipartition theorem holds in both the microcanonical ensemble, when the total energy of the system is constant, and also in the canonical ensemble, when the system is coupled to a heat bath with which it can exchange energy. Derivations of the general formula are given later in the article.

The general formula is equivalent to the following two:

1. $\left\langle x_n \frac{\partial H}{\partial x_n} \right\rangle = k_\text{B} T \quad \text{for all } n$
2. $\left\langle x_m \frac{\partial H}{\partial x_n} \right\rangle = 0 \quad \text{for all } m \neq n.$

If a degree of freedom x_{n} appears only as a quadratic term a_{n}x_{n}^{2} in the Hamiltonian H, then the first of these formulae implies that
$$k_\text{B} T = \left\langle x_n \frac{\partial H}{\partial x_n}\right\rangle = 2\left\langle a_n x_n^2 \right\rangle,$$
which is twice the contribution that this degree of freedom makes to the average energy $\langle H\rangle$. Thus the equipartition theorem for systems with quadratic energies follows easily from the general formula. A similar argument, with 2 replaced by s, applies to energies of the form a_{n}x_{n}^{s}.

The degrees of freedom x_{n} are coordinates on the phase space of the system and are therefore commonly subdivided into generalized position coordinates q_{k} and generalized momentum coordinates p_{k}, where p_{k} is the conjugate momentum to q_{k}. In this situation, formula 1 means that for all k,
$$\left\langle p_{k} \frac{\partial H}{\partial p_{k}} \right\rangle =  \left\langle q_k \frac{\partial H}{\partial q_k} \right\rangle = k_\text{B} T.$$

Using the equations of Hamiltonian mechanics, these formulae may also be written
$$\left\langle p_k \frac{dq_k}{dt} \right\rangle = -\left\langle q_k \frac{dp_k}{dt} \right\rangle = k_\text{B} T.$$

Similarly, one can show using formula 2 that
$$\left\langle p_j \frac{\partial H}{\partial p_k} \right\rangle =
\left\langle q_j \frac{\partial H}{\partial q_k} \right\rangle = 0 \quad \text{ for all } \, j \neq k.$$
and
$$\left\langle p_j \frac{\partial q_k}{\partial t} \right\rangle =
-\left\langle q_j \frac{\partial p_k}{\partial t} \right\rangle = 0 \quad \text{ for all } \, j \neq k.$$

=== Relation to the virial theorem ===
The general equipartition theorem is an extension of the virial theorem (proposed in 1870), which states that
$$\left\langle \sum_k q_k \frac{\partial H}{\partial q_{k}} \right\rangle =
\left\langle \sum_k p_k \frac{\partial H}{\partial p_{k}} \right\rangle =
\left\langle \sum_k p_k \frac{dq_k}{dt} \right\rangle = -\left\langle \sum_k q_k \frac{dp_k}{dt} \right\rangle,$$
where t denotes time. Two key differences are that the virial theorem relates summed rather than individual averages to each other, and it does not connect them to the temperature T. Another difference is that traditional derivations of the virial theorem use averages over time, whereas those of the equipartition theorem use averages over phase space.

== Applications ==
=== Ideal gas law ===
Ideal gases provide an important application of the equipartition theorem. As well as providing the formula
$$\begin{align}
\langle H^{\mathrm{kin}} \rangle &= \frac{1}{2m} \langle p_{x}^{2} + p_{y}^{2} + p_{z}^{2} \rangle\\
&=  \frac{1}{2} \left(
\left\langle p_{x} \frac{\partial H^{\mathrm{kin}}}{\partial p_{x}} \right\rangle +
\left\langle p_{y} \frac{\partial H^{\mathrm{kin}}}{\partial p_{y}} \right\rangle +
\left\langle p_{z} \frac{\partial H^{\mathrm{kin}}}{\partial p_{z}} \right\rangle \right) =
\frac{3}{2} k_\text{B} T
\end{align}$$
for the average kinetic energy per particle, the equipartition theorem can be used to derive the ideal gas law from classical mechanics. If q = (q_{x}, q_{y}, q_{z}) and p = (p_{x}, p_{y}, p_{z}) denote the position vector and momentum of a particle in the gas, and F is the net force on that particle, then
$$\begin{align}
\langle \mathbf{q} \cdot \mathbf{F} \rangle &= \left\langle q_x \frac{dp_x}{dt} \right\rangle +
\left\langle q_y \frac{dp_y}{dt} \right\rangle +
\left\langle q_z \frac{dp_z}{dt} \right\rangle\\
&=-\left\langle q_x \frac{\partial H}{\partial q_x} \right\rangle -
\left\langle q_y \frac{\partial H}{\partial q_y} \right\rangle -
\left\langle q_z \frac{\partial H}{\partial q_z} \right\rangle = -3k_\text{B} T,
\end{align}$$
where the first equality is Newton's second law, and the second line uses Hamilton's equations and the equipartition formula. Summing over a system of N particles yields
$$3Nk_\text{B} T = - \left\langle \sum_{k=1}^{N} \mathbf{q}_{k} \cdot \mathbf{F}_{k} \right\rangle.$$

Figure 5. The kinetic energy of a particular molecule can fluctuate wildly, but the equipartition theorem allows its average energy to be calculated at any temperature. Equipartition also provides a derivation of the ideal gas law, an equation that relates the pressure, volume and temperature of the gas. (In this diagram five of the molecules have been colored red to track their motion; this coloration has no other significance.)

By Newton's third law and the ideal gas assumption, the net force on the system is the force applied by the walls of their container, and this force is given by the pressure P of the gas. Hence
$$-\left\langle\sum_{k=1}^{N} \mathbf{q}_{k} \cdot \mathbf{F}_{k}\right\rangle = P \oint_{\text{surface}} \mathbf{q} \cdot d\mathbf{S},$$
where dS is the infinitesimal area element along the walls of the container. Since the divergence of the position vector q is
$$\boldsymbol\nabla \cdot \mathbf{q} =
\frac{\partial q_x}{\partial q_x} +
\frac{\partial q_y}{\partial q_y} +
\frac{\partial q_z}{\partial q_z} = 3,$$
the divergence theorem implies that
$$P \oint_{\mathrm{surface}} \mathbf{q} \cdot \mathbf{dS} = P \int_{\mathrm{volume}} \left( \boldsymbol\nabla \cdot \mathbf{q} \right) \, dV = 3PV,$$
where dV is an infinitesimal volume within the container and V is the total volume of the container.

Putting these equalities together yields
$$3Nk_\text{B} T = -\left\langle \sum_{k=1}^N \mathbf{q}_k \cdot \mathbf{F}_k \right\rangle = 3PV,$$
which immediately implies the ideal gas law for N particles:
$$PV = N k_\text{B} T = nRT,$$
where n = N/N_{A} is the number of moles of gas and R = N_{A}k_{B} is the gas constant. Although equipartition provides a simple derivation of the ideal-gas law and the internal energy, the same results can be obtained by an alternative method using the partition function.

=== Diatomic gases ===
A diatomic gas can be modelled as two masses, m_{1} and m_{2}, joined by a spring of stiffness a, which is called the rigid rotor-harmonic oscillator approximation. The classical energy of this system is
$$H =
\frac{\left| \mathbf{p}_1 \right|^2}{2m_1} +
\frac{\left| \mathbf{p}_2 \right|^2}{2m_2} +
\frac{1}{2} a q^2,$$
where p_{1} and p_{2} are the momenta of the two atoms, and q is the deviation of the inter-atomic separation from its equilibrium value. Every degree of freedom in the energy is quadratic and, thus, should contribute 1/2k_{B}T to the total average energy, and 1/2k_{B} to the heat capacity. Therefore, the heat capacity of a gas of N diatomic molecules is predicted to be 7N·1/2k_{B}: the momenta p_{1} and p_{2} contribute three degrees of freedom each, and the extension q contributes the seventh. It follows that the heat capacity of a mole of diatomic molecules with no other degrees of freedom should be 7/2N_{A}k_{B} = 7/2R and, thus, the predicted molar heat capacity should be roughly 7 cal/(mol·K). However, the experimental values for molar heat capacities of diatomic gases are typically about 5 cal/(mol·K) and fall to 3 cal/(mol·K) at very low temperatures. This disagreement between the equipartition prediction and the experimental value of the molar heat capacity cannot be explained by using a more complex model of the molecule, since adding more degrees of freedom can only increase the predicted specific heat, not decrease it. This discrepancy was a key piece of evidence showing the need for a quantum theory of matter.

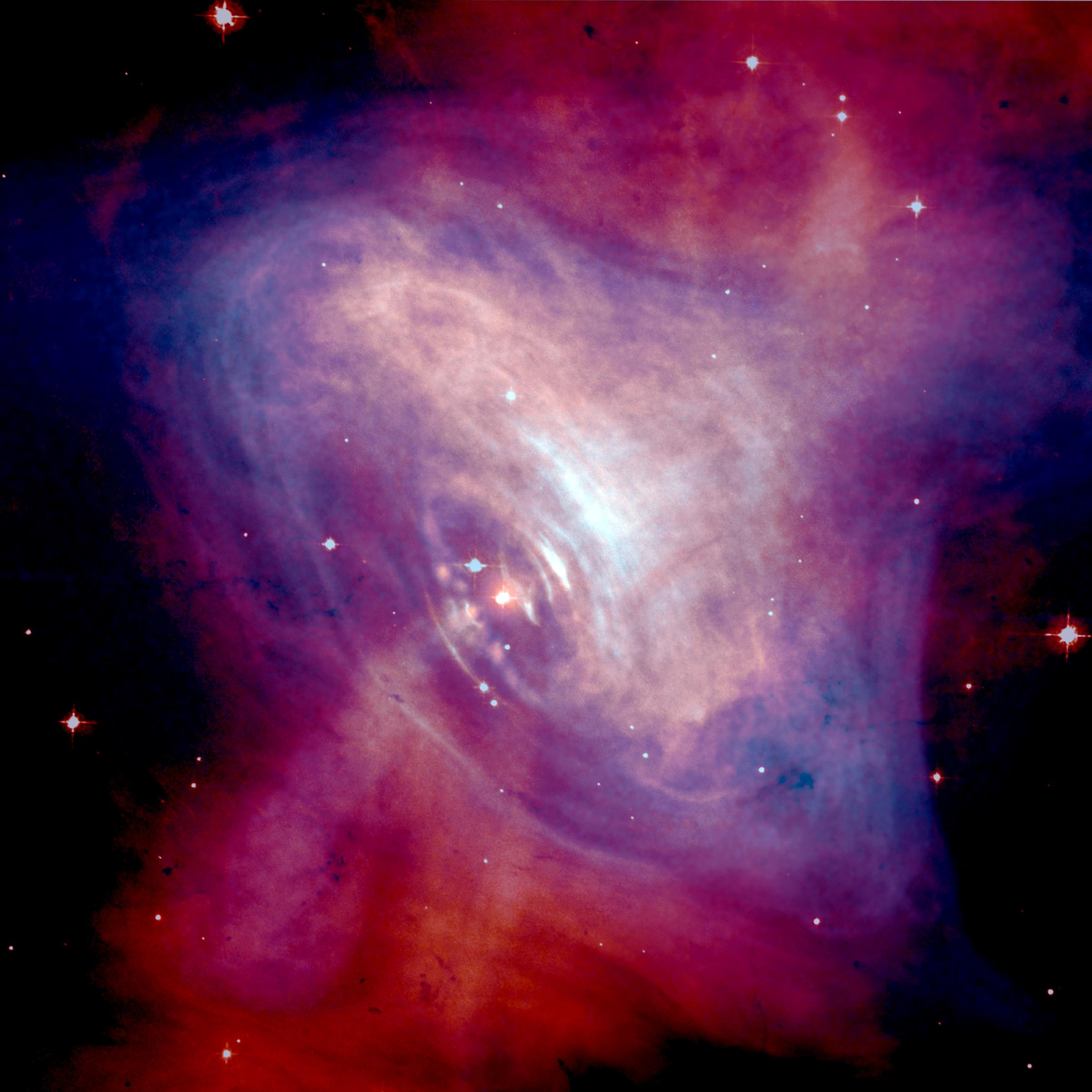
Figure 6. A combined X-ray and optical image of the Crab Nebula. At the heart of this nebula there is a rapidly rotating neutron star which has about one and a half times the mass of the Sun but is only 25 km across. The equipartition theorem is useful in predicting the properties of such neutron stars.

=== Extreme relativistic ideal gases ===
Equipartition was used above to derive the classical ideal gas law from Newtonian mechanics. However, relativistic effects become dominant in some systems, such as white dwarfs and neutron stars, and the ideal gas equations must be modified. The equipartition theorem provides a convenient way to derive the corresponding laws for an extreme relativistic ideal gas. In such cases, the kinetic energy of a single particle is given by the formula
$$H_{\mathrm{kin}} \approx cp = c \sqrt{p_x^2 + p_y^2 + p_z^2}.$$
Taking the derivative of H with respect to the p_{x} momentum component gives the formula
$$p_x \frac{\partial H_{\mathrm{kin}}}{\partial p_x}  = c \frac{p_x^2}{\sqrt{p_x^2 + p_y^2 + p_z^2}}$$
and similarly for the p_{y} and p_{z} components. Adding the three components together gives
$$\begin{align}
\langle H_{\mathrm{kin}} \rangle
&= \left\langle c \frac{p_x^2 + p_y^2 + p_z^2}{\sqrt{p_x^2 + p_y^2 + p_z^2}}  \right\rangle\\
&=
\left\langle p_x \frac{\partial H^{\mathrm{kin}}}{\partial p_x} \right\rangle +
\left\langle p_y \frac{\partial H^{\mathrm{kin}}}{\partial p_y} \right\rangle +
\left\langle p_z \frac{\partial H^{\mathrm{kin}}}{\partial p_z} \right\rangle \\
&= 3 k_\text{B} T
\end{align}$$
where the last equality follows from the equipartition formula. Thus, the average total energy of an extreme relativistic gas is twice that of the non-relativistic case: for N particles, it is 3 Nk_{B}T.

=== Non-ideal gases ===
In an ideal gas the particles are assumed to interact only through collisions. The equipartition theorem may also be used to derive the energy and pressure of "non-ideal gases" in which the particles also interact with one another through conservative forces whose potential U(r) depends only on the distance r between the particles. This situation can be described by first restricting attention to a single gas particle, and approximating the rest of the gas by a spherically symmetric distribution. It is then customary to introduce a radial distribution function g(r) such that the probability density of finding another particle at a distance r from the given particle is equal to 4πr^{2}ρg(r), where ρ = N/V is the mean density of the gas. It follows that the mean potential energy associated to the interaction of the given particle with the rest of the gas is
$$\langle h_{\mathrm{pot}} \rangle = \int_0^\infty 4\pi r^2 \rho U(r) g(r)\, dr.$$
The total mean potential energy of the gas is therefore $\langle H_\text{pot} \rangle = \tfrac12 N \langle h_{\mathrm{pot}} \rangle$, where N is the number of particles in the gas, and the factor 1/2 is needed because summation over all the particles counts each interaction twice. Adding kinetic and potential energies, then applying equipartition, yields the energy equation
$$H = \langle H_{\mathrm{kin}} \rangle + \langle H_{\mathrm{pot}} \rangle =
\frac{3}{2} Nk_\text{B}T + 2\pi N \rho \int_0^\infty r^2 U(r) g(r) \, dr.$$
A similar argument, can be used to derive the pressure equation
$$3Nk_\text{B}T = 3PV + 2\pi N \rho \int_0^\infty r^3 U'(r) g(r)\, dr.$$

=== Anharmonic oscillators ===
An anharmonic oscillator (in contrast to a simple harmonic oscillator) is one in which the potential energy is not quadratic in the extension q (the generalized position which measures the deviation of the system from equilibrium). Such oscillators provide a complementary point of view on the equipartition theorem. Simple examples are provided by potential energy functions of the form
$$H_{\mathrm{pot}} = C q^{s},\,$$
where C and s are arbitrary real constants. In these cases, the law of equipartition predicts that
$$k_\text{B} T = \left\langle q \frac{\partial H_{\mathrm{pot}}}{\partial q} \right\rangle =
\langle q \cdot s C q^{s-1} \rangle = \langle s C q^{s} \rangle = s \langle H_{\mathrm{pot}} \rangle.$$
Thus, the average potential energy equals k_{B}T/s, not k_{B}T/2 as for the quadratic harmonic oscillator (where s = 2).

More generally, a typical energy function of a one-dimensional system has a Taylor expansion in the extension q:
$$H_{\mathrm{pot}} = \sum_{n=2}^\infty C_n q^n$$
for non-negative integers n. There is no n = 1 term, because at the equilibrium point, there is no net force and so the first derivative of the energy is zero. The n = 0 term need not be included, since the energy at the equilibrium position may be set to zero by convention. In this case, the law of equipartition predicts that
$$k_\text{B} T = \left\langle q \frac{\partial H_{\mathrm{pot}}}{\partial q} \right\rangle =
\sum_{n=2}^{\infty} \langle q \cdot n C_{n} q^{n-1} \rangle =
\sum_{n=2}^{\infty} n C_{n} \langle q^{n} \rangle.$$
In contrast to the other examples cited here, the equipartition formula
$$\langle H_{\mathrm{pot}} \rangle = \frac{1}{2} k_\text{B} T -
\sum_{n=3}^{\infty} \left( \frac{n - 2}{2} \right) C_{n} \langle q^{n} \rangle$$
does not allow the average potential energy to be written in terms of known constants.

=== Brownian motion ===
Figure 7. Example Brownian motion of a particle in three dimensions.

The equipartition theorem can be used to derive the Brownian motion of a particle from the Langevin equation. According to that equation, the motion of a particle of mass m with velocity v is governed by Newton's second law
$$\frac{d\mathbf{v}}{dt} = \frac{1}{m} \mathbf{F} = -\frac{\mathbf{v}}{\tau} + \frac{1}{m} \mathbf{F}_{\mathrm{rnd}},$$
where F_{rnd} is a random force representing the random collisions of the particle and the surrounding molecules, and where the time constant τ reflects the drag force that opposes the particle's motion through the solution. The drag force is often written F_{drag} = −γv; therefore, the time constant τ equals m/γ.

The dot product of this equation with the position vector r, after averaging, yields the equation
$$\left\langle \mathbf{r} \cdot \frac{d\mathbf{v}}{dt} \right\rangle +
\frac{1}{\tau} \langle \mathbf{r} \cdot \mathbf{v} \rangle = 0$$
for Brownian motion (since the random force F_{rnd} is uncorrelated with the position r). Using the mathematical identities
$$\frac{d}{dt} \left( \mathbf{r} \cdot \mathbf{r} \right) =
\frac{d}{dt} \left( r^{2} \right) = 2 \left( \mathbf{r} \cdot \mathbf{v} \right)$$
and
$$\frac{d}{dt} \left( \mathbf{r} \cdot \mathbf{v} \right) = v^{2} + \mathbf{r} \cdot \frac{d\mathbf{v}}{dt},$$
the basic equation for Brownian motion can be transformed into
$$\frac{d^{2}}{dt^{2}} \langle r^{2} \rangle + \frac{1}{\tau} \frac{d}{dt} \langle r^{2} \rangle =
2 \langle v^{2} \rangle = \frac{6}{m} k_\text{B} T,$$
where the last equality follows from the equipartition theorem for translational kinetic energy:
$$\langle H_{\mathrm{kin}} \rangle = \left\langle \frac{p^2}{2m} \right\rangle = \langle \tfrac{1}{2} m v^{2} \rangle = \tfrac{3}{2} k_\text{B} T.$$
The above differential equation for $\langle r^2\rangle$ (with suitable initial conditions) may be solved exactly:
$$\langle r^{2} \rangle = \frac{6k_\text{B} T \tau^{2}}{m} \left( e^{-t/\tau} - 1 + \frac{t}{\tau} \right).$$
On small time scales, with t ≪ τ, the particle acts as a freely moving particle: by the Taylor series of the exponential function, the squared distance grows approximately quadratically:
$$\langle r^{2} \rangle \approx \frac{3k_\text{B} T}{m} t^2 = \langle v^{2} \rangle t^{2}.$$
However, on long time scales, with t ≫ τ, the exponential and constant terms are negligible, and the squared distance grows only linearly:
$$\langle r^{2} \rangle \approx \frac{6k_\text{B} T\tau}{m} t = \frac{6 k_\text{B} T t}{\gamma}.$$
This describes the diffusion of the particle over time. An analogous equation for the rotational diffusion of a rigid molecule can be derived in a similar way.

=== Stellar physics ===
The equipartition theorem and the related virial theorem have long been used as a tool in astrophysics. As examples, the virial theorem may be used to estimate stellar temperatures or the Chandrasekhar limit on the mass of white dwarf stars.

The average temperature of a star can be estimated from the equipartition theorem. Since most stars are spherically symmetric, the total gravitational potential energy can be estimated by integration
$$H_{\mathrm{grav}} = -\int_0^R \frac{4\pi r^2 G}{r} M(r)\, \rho(r)\, dr,$$
where M(r) is the mass within a radius r and ρ(r) is the stellar density at radius r; G represents the gravitational constant and R the total radius of the star. Assuming a constant density throughout the star, this integration yields the formula
$$H_{\mathrm{grav}} = - \frac{3G M^{2}}{5R},$$
where M is the star's total mass. Hence, the average potential energy of a single particle is
$$\langle H_{\mathrm{grav}} \rangle = \frac{H_{\mathrm{grav}}}{N} = - \frac{3G M^{2}}{5RN},$$
where N is the number of particles in the star. Since most stars are composed mainly of ionized hydrogen, N equals roughly M/m_{p}, where m_{p} is the mass of one proton. Application of the equipartition theorem gives an estimate of the star's temperature
$$\left\langle r \frac{\partial H_{\mathrm{grav}}}{\partial r} \right\rangle = \langle -H_{\mathrm{grav}} \rangle = k_\text{B} T = \frac{3G M^2}{5RN}.$$
Substitution of the mass and radius of the Sun yields an estimated solar temperature of T = 14 million kelvins, very close to its core temperature of 15 million kelvins. However, the Sun is much more complex than assumed by this model—both its temperature and density vary strongly with radius—and such excellent agreement (≈7% relative error) is partly fortuitous.

=== Star formation ===
The same formulae may be applied to determining the conditions for star formation in giant molecular clouds. A local fluctuation in the density of such a cloud can lead to a runaway condition in which the cloud collapses inwards under its own gravity. Such a collapse occurs when the equipartition theorem—or, equivalently, the virial theorem—is no longer valid, i.e., when the gravitational potential energy exceeds twice the kinetic energy
$$\frac{3G M^{2}}{5R} > 3 N k_\text{B} T.$$
Assuming a constant density ρ for the cloud
$$M = \frac{4}{3} \pi R^{3} \rho$$
yields a minimum mass for stellar contraction, the Jeans mass M_{J}
$$M_\text{J}^{2} = \left( \frac{5k_\text{B}T}{G m_{p}} \right)^{3} \left( \frac{3}{4\pi \rho} \right).$$
Substituting the values typically observed in such clouds (T = 150 K, ρ = 2×10^{−16} g/cm^{3}) gives an estimated minimum mass of 17 solar masses, which is consistent with observed star formation. This effect is also known as the Jeans instability, after the British physicist James Hopwood Jeans who published it in 1902.

== Derivations ==
=== Kinetic energies and the Maxwell–Boltzmann distribution ===
The original formulation of the equipartition theorem states that, in any physical system in thermal equilibrium, every particle has exactly the same average translational kinetic energy, 3/2k_{B}T. However, this is true only for ideal gas, and the same result can be derived from the Maxwell–Boltzmann distribution. First, we choose to consider only the Maxwell–Boltzmann distribution of velocity of the z-component
$$f (v_z) = \sqrt{\dfrac{m}{2\pi k_\text{B}T}}\;e^{\frac{-m{v_z}^2}{2k_\text{B}T}}$$

with this equation, we can calculate the mean square velocity of the z-component
$$\langle {v_z}^2 \rangle = \int_{-\infty}^{\infty} f (v_z){v_z}^2 dv_z = \dfrac{k_\text{B}T}{m}$$

Since different components of velocity are independent of each other and share the same distribution function, the average translational kinetic energy is given by
$$\langle E_k \rangle = \dfrac 3 2 m \langle {v_z}^2 \rangle = \dfrac 3 2 k_\text{B}T$$

Notice, the Maxwell–Boltzmann distribution should not be confused with the Boltzmann distribution, which the former can be derived from the latter by assuming the energy of a particle is equal to its translational kinetic energy.

As stated by the equipartition theorem. The same result can also be obtained by averaging the particle energy using the probability of finding the particle in certain quantum energy state.

=== Quadratic energies and the partition function ===
More generally, the equipartition theorem states that any degree of freedom x which appears in the total energy H only as a simple quadratic term Ax^{2}, where A is a constant, has an average energy of 1/2k_{B}T in thermal equilibrium. In this case the equipartition theorem may be derived from the partition function Z(β), where β = 1/(k_{B}T) is the canonical inverse temperature. Integration over the variable x yields a factor
$$Z_{x} = \int_{-\infty}^{\infty} dx \ e^{-\beta A x^{2}} = \sqrt{\frac{\pi}{\beta A}},$$
in the formula for Z. The mean energy associated with this factor is given by
$$\langle H_{x} \rangle = - \frac{\partial \log Z_{x}}{\partial \beta} = \frac{1}{2\beta} = \frac{1}{2} k_\text{B} T$$
as stated by the equipartition theorem.

=== General proofs ===
General derivations of the equipartition theorem can be found in many statistical mechanics textbooks, both for the microcanonical ensemble and for the canonical ensemble. They involve taking averages over the phase space of the system, which is a symplectic manifold.

To explain these derivations, the following notation is introduced. First, the phase space is described in terms of generalized position coordinates q_{j} together with their conjugate momenta p_{j}. The quantities q_{j} completely describe the configuration of the system, while the quantities (q_{j},p_{j}) together completely describe its state.

Secondly, the infinitesimal volume
$$d\Gamma = \prod_i  dq_i \, dp_i \,$$
of the phase space is introduced and used to define the volume Σ(E, ΔE) of the portion of phase space where the energy H of the system lies between two limits, E and E + ΔE:
$$\Sigma (E, \Delta E) = \int_{H \in \left[E, E+\Delta E \right]} d\Gamma .$$
In this expression, ΔE is assumed to be very small, ΔE ≪ E. Similarly, Ω(E) is defined to be the total volume of phase space where the energy is less than E:
$$\Omega (E) = \int_{H < E} d\Gamma.$$

Since ΔE is very small, the following integrations are equivalent
$$\int_{H \in \left[ E, E+\Delta E \right]} \ldots d\Gamma  = \Delta E \frac{\partial}{\partial E} \int_{H < E} \ldots d\Gamma,$$
where the ellipses represent the integrand. From this, it follows that Σ is proportional to ΔE
$$\Sigma(E, \Delta E) = \Delta E \ \frac{\partial \Omega}{\partial E} = \Delta E \ \rho(E),$$
where ρ(E) is the density of states. By the usual definitions of statistical mechanics, the entropy S equals k_{B} log Ω(E), and the temperature T is defined by
$$\frac{1}{T} = \frac{\partial S}{\partial E} = k_\text{B} \frac{\partial \log \Omega}{\partial E} = k_\text{B} \frac{1}{\Omega}\,\frac{\partial \Omega}{\partial E} .$$

==== The canonical ensemble ====
In the canonical ensemble, the system is in thermal equilibrium with an infinite heat bath at temperature T (in kelvins). The probability of each state in phase space is given by its Boltzmann factor times a normalization factor $\mathcal{N}$, which is chosen so that the probabilities sum to one
$$\mathcal{N} \int e^{-\beta H(p, q)} d\Gamma = 1,$$
where β = 1/(k_{B}T). Using Integration by parts for a phase-space variable x_{k} the above can be written as
$$\mathcal{N} \int e^{-\beta H(p, q)} d\Gamma = \mathcal{N} \int d[x_k e^{-\beta H(p, q)}] d\Gamma_k - \mathcal{N} \int x_k \frac{\partial e^{-\beta H(p, q)}}{\partial x_k} d\Gamma,$$
where dΓ_{k} = dΓ/dx_{k}, i.e., the first integration is not carried out over x_{k}. Performing the first integral between two limits a and b and simplifying the second integral yields the equation
$$\mathcal{N} \int  \left[ e^{-\beta H(p, q)} x_{k} \right]_{x_{k}=a}^{x_{k}=b} d\Gamma_{k}+
\mathcal{N} \int  e^{-\beta H(p, q)} x_{k} \beta \frac{\partial H}{\partial x_{k}} d\Gamma = 1,$$

The first term is usually zero, either because x_{k} is zero at the limits, or because the energy goes to infinity at those limits. In that case, the equipartition theorem for the canonical ensemble follows immediately
$$\mathcal{N} \int e^{-\beta H(p, q)} x_k \frac{\partial H}{\partial x_{k}} \,d\Gamma =
\left\langle x_k \frac{\partial H}{\partial x_k} \right\rangle = \frac{1}{\beta} = k_\text{B} T.$$

Here, the averaging symbolized by $\langle \ldots \rangle$ is the ensemble average taken over the canonical ensemble.

==== The microcanonical ensemble ====
In the microcanonical ensemble, the system is isolated from the rest of the world, or at least very weakly coupled to it. Hence, its total energy is effectively constant; to be definite, we say that the total energy H is confined between E and E+dE. For a given energy E and spread dE, there is a region of phase space Σ in which the system has that energy, and the probability of each state in that region of phase space is equal, by the definition of the microcanonical ensemble. Given these definitions, the equipartition average of phase-space variables x_{m} (which could be either q_{k} or p_{k}) and x_{n} is given by

$$\begin{align}
\left\langle x_{m} \frac{\partial H}{\partial x_{n}} \right \rangle &=
\frac{1}{\Sigma}   \, \int_{H \in \left[ E, E+\Delta E \right]}  x_{m} \frac{\partial H}{\partial x_{n}} \,d\Gamma\\
&=\frac{\Delta E}{\Sigma}\, \frac{\partial}{\partial E} \int_{H < E}  x_{m} \frac{\partial H}{\partial x_{n}} \,d\Gamma\\
&= \frac{1}{\rho} \,\frac{\partial}{\partial E} \int_{H < E}  x_{m} \frac{\partial \left( H - E \right)}{\partial x_{n}} \,d\Gamma,
\end{align}$$

where the last equality follows because E is a constant that does not depend on x_{n}. Integrating by parts yields the relation
$$\begin{align}
\int_{H < E} x_{m} \frac{\partial ( H - E )}{\partial x_{n}} \,d\Gamma &=
\int_{H < E} \frac{\partial}{\partial x_{n}} \bigl( x_m ( H - E ) \bigr) \,d\Gamma -
\int_{H < E} \delta_{mn} ( H - E ) d\Gamma \\
&= \delta_{mn} \int_{H < E} ( E - H ) \,d\Gamma,
\end{align}$$
since the first term on the right hand side of the first line is zero (it can be rewritten as an integral of H − E on the hypersurface where H = E).

Substitution of this result into the previous equation yields
$$\left\langle x_m \frac{\partial H}{\partial x_{n}} \right\rangle
= \delta_{mn} \frac{1}{\rho} \, \frac{\partial}{\partial E} \int_{H < E} \left( E - H \right)\,d\Gamma
= \delta_{mn} \frac{1}{\rho} \, \int_{H < E} \,d\Gamma
= \delta_{mn} \frac{\Omega}{\rho}.$$

Since $\rho = \frac{\partial \Omega}{\partial E}$ the equipartition theorem follows:
$$\left\langle x_{m} \frac{\partial H}{\partial x_{n}} \right\rangle =
\delta_{mn} \left(\frac{1}{\Omega} \frac{\partial \Omega}{\partial E}\right)^{-1}  =
\delta_{mn} \left(\frac{\partial \log \Omega} {\partial E}\right)^{-1} = \delta_{mn} k_\text{B} T.$$

Thus, we have derived the general formulation of the equipartition theorem
$$\left\langle x_{m} \frac{\partial H}{\partial x_{n}} \right\rangle = \delta_{mn} k_\text{B} T,$$
which was so useful in the applications described above.

== Limitations ==
Figure 9. Energy is not shared among the various normal modes in an isolated system of ideal coupled oscillators; the energy in each mode is constant and independent of the energy in the other modes. Hence, the equipartition theorem does not hold for such a system in the microcanonical ensemble (when isolated), although it does hold in the canonical ensemble (when coupled to a heat bath). However, by adding a sufficiently strong nonlinear coupling between the modes, energy will be shared and equipartition holds in both ensembles.

=== Requirement of ergodicity ===
The law of equipartition holds only for ergodic systems in thermal equilibrium, which implies that all states with the same energy must be equally likely to be populated. Consequently, it must be possible to exchange energy among all its various forms within the system, or with an external heat bath in the canonical ensemble. The number of physical systems that have been rigorously proven to be ergodic is small; a famous example is the hard-sphere system of Yakov Sinai. The requirements for isolated systems to ensure ergodicity—and, thus equipartition—have been studied, and provided motivation for the modern chaos theory of dynamical systems. A chaotic Hamiltonian system need not be ergodic, although that is usually a good assumption.

A commonly cited counter-example where energy is not shared among its various forms and where equipartition does not hold in the microcanonical ensemble is a system of coupled harmonic oscillators. If the system is isolated from the rest of the world, the energy in each normal mode is constant; energy is not transferred from one mode to another. Hence, equipartition does not hold for such a system; the amount of energy in each normal mode is fixed at its initial value. If sufficiently strong nonlinear terms are present in the energy function, energy may be transferred between the normal modes, leading to ergodicity and rendering the law of equipartition valid. However, the Kolmogorov–Arnold–Moser theorem states that energy will not be exchanged unless the nonlinear perturbations are strong enough; if they are too small, the energy will remain trapped in at least some of the modes.

Another simple example is an ideal gas of a finite number of colliding particles in a round vessel. Due to the vessel's symmetry, the angular momentum of such a gas is conserved. Therefore, not all states with the same energy are populated. This results in the mean particle energy being dependent on the mass of this particle, and also on the masses of all the other particles.

Another way ergodicity can be broken is by the existence of nonlinear soliton symmetries. In 1953, Fermi, Pasta, Ulam and Tsingou conducted computer simulations of a vibrating string that included a non-linear term (quadratic in one test, cubic in another, and a piecewise linear approximation to a cubic in a third). They found that the behavior of the system was quite different from what intuition based on equipartition would have led them to expect. Instead of the energies in the modes becoming equally shared, the system exhibited a very complicated quasi-periodic behavior. This puzzling result was eventually explained by Kruskal and Zabusky in 1965 in a paper which, by connecting the simulated system to the Korteweg–de Vries equation led to the development of soliton mathematics.

=== Failure due to quantum effects ===
The law of equipartition breaks down when the thermal energy k_{B}T is significantly smaller than the spacing between energy levels. Equipartition no longer holds because it is a poor approximation to assume that the energy levels form a smooth continuum, which is required in the derivations of the equipartition theorem above. Historically, the failures of the classical equipartition theorem to explain specific heats and black-body radiation were critical in showing the need for a new theory of matter and radiation, namely, quantum mechanics and quantum field theory.

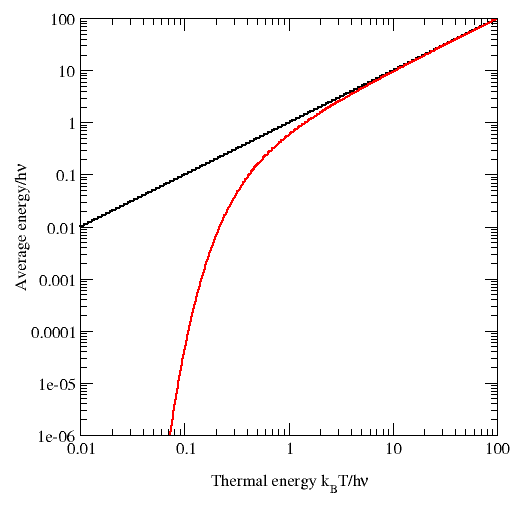
Figure 10. Log–log plot of the average energy of a quantum mechanical oscillator (shown in red) as a function of temperature. For comparison, the value predicted by the equipartition theorem is shown in black. At high temperatures, the two agree nearly perfectly, but at low temperatures when k_{B}T ≪ hν, the quantum mechanical value decreases much more rapidly. This resolves the problem of the ultraviolet catastrophe: for a given temperature, the energy in the high-frequency modes (where hν ≫ k_{B}T) is almost zero.

To illustrate the breakdown of equipartition, consider the average energy in a single (quantum) harmonic oscillator, which was discussed above for the classical case. Neglecting the irrelevant zero-point energy term since it can be factored out of the exponential functions involved in the probability distribution, the quantum harmonic oscillator energy levels are given by E_{n} = nhν, where h is the Planck constant, ν is the fundamental frequency of the oscillator, and n is an integer. The probability of a given energy level being populated in the canonical ensemble is given by its Boltzmann factor
$$P(E_n) = \frac{e^{-n\beta h\nu}}{Z},$$
where β = 1/k_{B}T and the denominator Z is the partition function, here a geometric series
$$Z = \sum_{n=0}^{\infty} e^{-n\beta h\nu} = \frac{1}{1 - e^{-\beta h\nu}}.$$

Its average energy is given by
$$\langle H \rangle = \sum_{n=0}^{\infty} E_{n} P(E_{n}) =
\frac{1}{Z} \sum_{n=0}^{\infty} nh\nu \ e^{-n\beta h\nu} =
-\frac{1}{Z} \frac{\partial Z}{\partial \beta} =
-\frac{\partial \log Z}{\partial \beta}.$$

Substituting the formula for Z gives the final result
$$\langle H \rangle = h\nu \frac{e^{-\beta h\nu}}{1 - e^{-\beta h\nu}}.$$

At high temperatures, when the thermal energy k_{B}T is much greater than the spacing hν between energy levels, the exponential argument βhν is much less than one and the average energy becomes k_{B}T, in agreement with the equipartition theorem (Figure 10). However, at low temperatures, when hν ≫ k_{B}T, the average energy goes to zero—the higher-frequency energy levels are "frozen out" (Figure 10). As another example, the internal excited electronic states of a hydrogen atom do not contribute to its specific heat as a gas at room temperature, since the thermal energy k_{B}T (roughly 0.025 eV) is much smaller than the spacing between the lowest and next higher electronic energy levels (roughly 10 eV).

Similar considerations apply whenever the energy level spacing is much larger than the thermal energy. This reasoning was used by Max Planck and Albert Einstein, among others, to resolve the ultraviolet catastrophe of black-body radiation. The paradox arises because there are an infinite number of independent modes of the electromagnetic field in a closed container, each of which may be treated as a harmonic oscillator. If each electromagnetic mode were to have an average energy k_{B}T, there would be an infinite amount of energy in the container. However, by the reasoning above, the average energy in the higher-frequency modes goes to zero as ν goes to infinity; moreover, Planck's law of black-body radiation, which describes the experimental distribution of energy in the modes, follows from the same reasoning.

Other, more subtle quantum effects can lead to corrections to equipartition, such as identical particles and continuous symmetries. The effects of identical particles can be dominant at very high densities and low temperatures. For example, the valence electrons in a metal can have a mean kinetic energy of a few electronvolts, which would normally correspond to a temperature of tens of thousands of kelvins. Such a state, in which the density is high enough that the Pauli exclusion principle invalidates the classical approach, is called a degenerate fermion gas. Such gases are important for the structure of white dwarf and neutron stars. At low temperatures, a fermionic analogue of the Bose–Einstein condensate (in which a large number of identical particles occupy the lowest-energy state) can form; such superfluid electrons are responsible for superconductivity.

== See also ==
- Kinetic theory
- Quantum statistical mechanics
