= Jean Henri Hassenfratz =

French chemist (1755–1827)

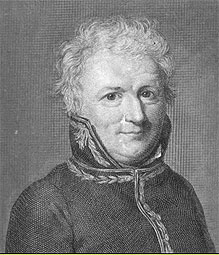
Portrait of Jean-Henri Hassenfratz

Jean Henri Hassenfratz (20 December 1755 – 26 February 1827) was a French chemist, physics professor, mine inspector, and participant in the French Revolution.

In 1794, Hassenfratz took part (with Monge) in the creation of the École Polytechnique (first known as École centrale des travaux publics). Hassenfratz became its first professor of physics, a position he held until 1815, when he was succeeded by Alexis Petit (a former child prodigy and Polytechnique alumni who would soon discover the Dulong–Petit law, in 1819).
