= Kopp's law =

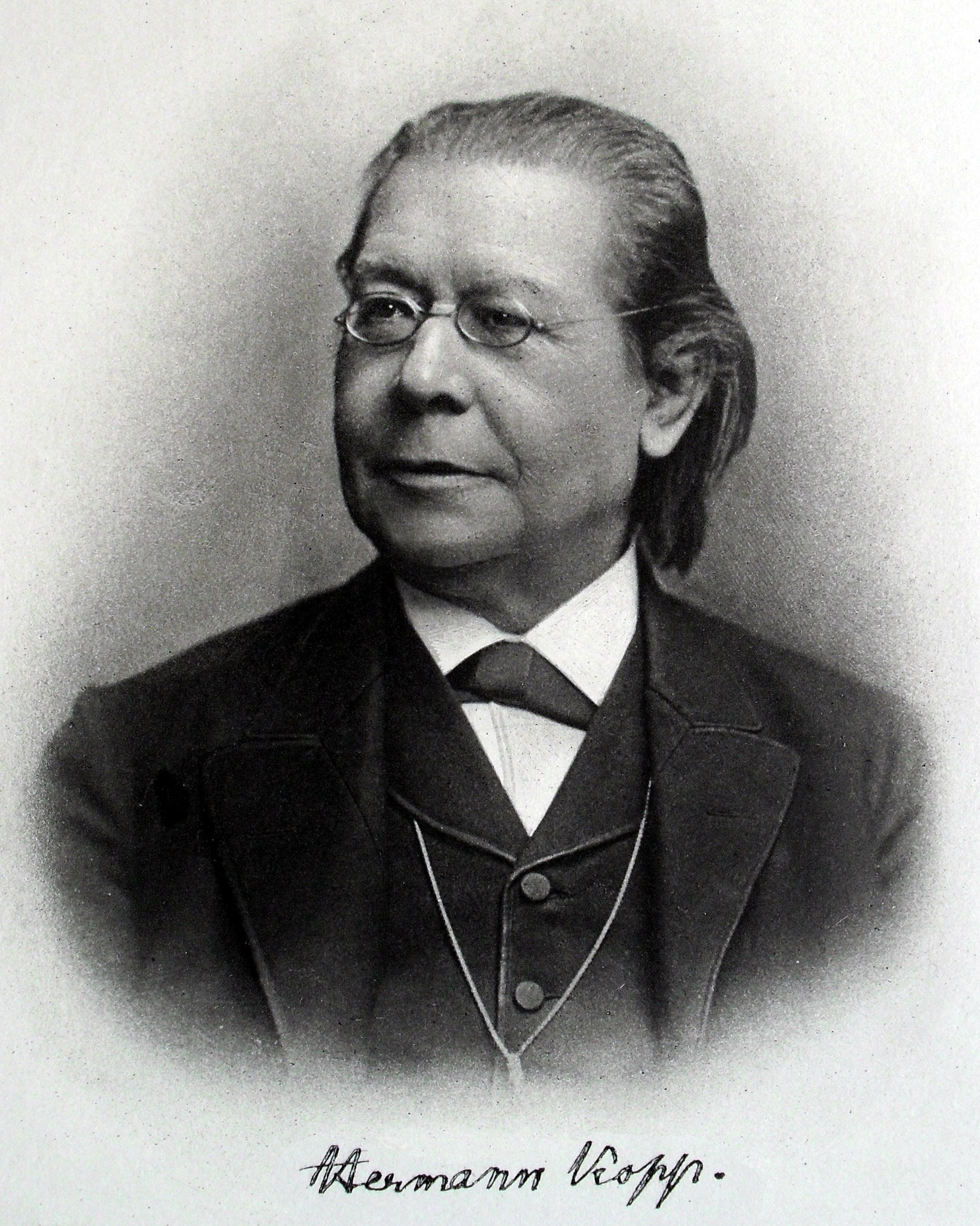
Hermann Franz Moritz Kopp

Kopp's law can refer to either of two relationships discovered by the German chemist Hermann Franz Moritz Kopp (1817–1892).

1. Kopp found "that the molecular heat capacity of a solid compound is the sum of the atomic heat capacities of the elements composing it; the elements having atomic heat capacities lower than those required by the Dulong–Petit law retain these lower values in their compounds".
2. In studying organic compounds, Kopp found a regular relationship between boiling points and the number of CH_{2} groups present.

== Kopp–Neumann law ==
The Kopp–Neumann law, named for Kopp and Franz Ernst Neumann, is a common approach for determining the specific heat C (in J·kg^{−1}·K^{−1}) of compounds using the following equation:
$$C = \sum_{i=1}^N C_i f_i,$$
where N is the total number of compound constituents, and C_{i} and f_{i} denote the specific heat and mass fraction of the i-th constituent. This law works surprisingly well at room-temperature conditions, but poorly at elevated temperatures.

== See also ==
- Rule of mixtures
