= Alexis Thérèse Petit =

French physicist (1791–1820)

- Born: October 2, 1791; Vesoul, France
- Died: June 21, 1820 (aged 28); Paris, France
- Education: École polytechnique
- Known for: Dulong–Petit law
- Scientific career
- Fields: Physics; Thermodynamics
- Workplaces: École polytechnique
- Thesis: Théorie mathématique de l'action capillaire (1812)

Alexis Thérèse Petit (French: [pəti]; 2 October 1791 – 21 June 1820) was a French physicist.

Petit is known for his work on the efficiencies of air- and steam-engines, published in 1818 (Mémoire sur l’emploi du principe des forces vives dans le calcul des machines). His well-known discussions with the French physicist Sadi Carnot, founder of thermodynamics, may have stimulated Carnot in his reflexions on heat engines and thermodynamic efficiency. The Dulong–Petit law (1819) is named after him and his collaborator Pierre Louis Dulong.

== Biography ==
=== Early life and studies ===
Petit was born in Vesoul, Haute-Saône. At the age of 10, he proved that he was already capable of taking the difficult entrance exam to France's most prestigious scientific school of the time, the École polytechnique of Paris. He was then placed in a preparatory school where he actually served as a "répétiteur" to help his own classmates digest the course material. He duly entered the Polytechnique at the lowest permissible age, in 1807, and graduated "hors-rang" in 1809 (which is to say that he clearly outranked all of his classmates).

After graduation, Petit stayed at Polytechnique as a faculty member, first as répétiteur in analysis and mechanics (1809) then in physics (1810).

=== Career ===
He taught for some time at Lycée Bonaparte. At Polytechnique, he served as a substitute (1814) for Jean Henri Hassenfratz whom he would replace in 1815. He thus became the second professor of physics at Polytechnique and the youngest person ever to hold that position, at the age of 23.

Petit and François Arago were brothers-in-law because they married two sisters. In 1814, the two men collaborated on a paper together.

Petit first collaborated with Pierre Louis Dulong for the competition of the French Academy of Sciences about refrigeration (1815). Petit is now probably best known for the surprising Dulong–Petit law concerning the specific heat capacity of metals, which both men formulated together in 1819 and which Albert Einstein explained almost a century later. Petit also designed a special thermometer (using weights) to determine the thermal dilatation coefficients of several metals.

=== Death ===
Petit died from tuberculosis at the age of 28, shortly after the passing of his wife. He was succeeded by Dulong as professor of physics at the Polytechnique in 1820.

== Personality ==
Jules Jamin, a contemporary and fellow physicist provides biographical and temperament details of Petit and Dulong:

Petit had a lively intelligence, an elegant and easy speech, he seduced with an amiable look, got easily attached, and surrendered himself to his tendencies rather than governing them. He was credited with an instinctive scientific intuition, a power of premature invention, certain presages of an assured future that everyone foresaw and even desired, so great was the benevolence which he inspired. Dulong was the opposite: His language was thoughtful, his attitude serious and his appearance cold[. . . ] He worked slowly but with certainty, with a continuity and a power of will that nothing stopped, I should say with a courage that no danger could push back. In the absence of that vivacity of the mind which invents easily, but likes to rest, he had the sense of scientific exactness, the gusto for precision experiments, the talent of combining them, the patience of completing them, and the art, unknown before him, to carry them to the limits of accuracy[. . . ] Petit had more mathematical tendency, Dulong was more experimental; the first carried in the work more brilliant easiness, the second more continuity; One represented imagination, the other reason, which moderates and contains it.

— Jules Jamin (1855),
