= Jamin interferometer =

Type of interferometer

Jamin interferometer

The Jamin interferometer is a type of interferometer, related to the Mach–Zehnder interferometer. It was developed in 1856 by the French physicist Jules Jamin.

The interferometer consists of two mirrors, made of the thickest glass possible. The Fresnel reflection from the first surface of the mirror acts as a beam splitter. The incident light is split into two rays, parallel to each other and displaced by an amount depending on the thickness of the mirror. The rays are recombined at the second mirror and ultimately imaged onto a screen.

If a phase-shifting element is added to one arm of the interferometer, then the displacement it causes can be determined by simply counting the interference fringes, i.e., the minima.

The Jamin interferometer allows very exact measurements of the refractive index and dispersion of gases; a transparent pressure chamber can be positioned in the instrument. The phase shift due to changes in pressure is quite easy to measure.
