= Hermann Franz Moritz Kopp =

German chemist (1817–1892)

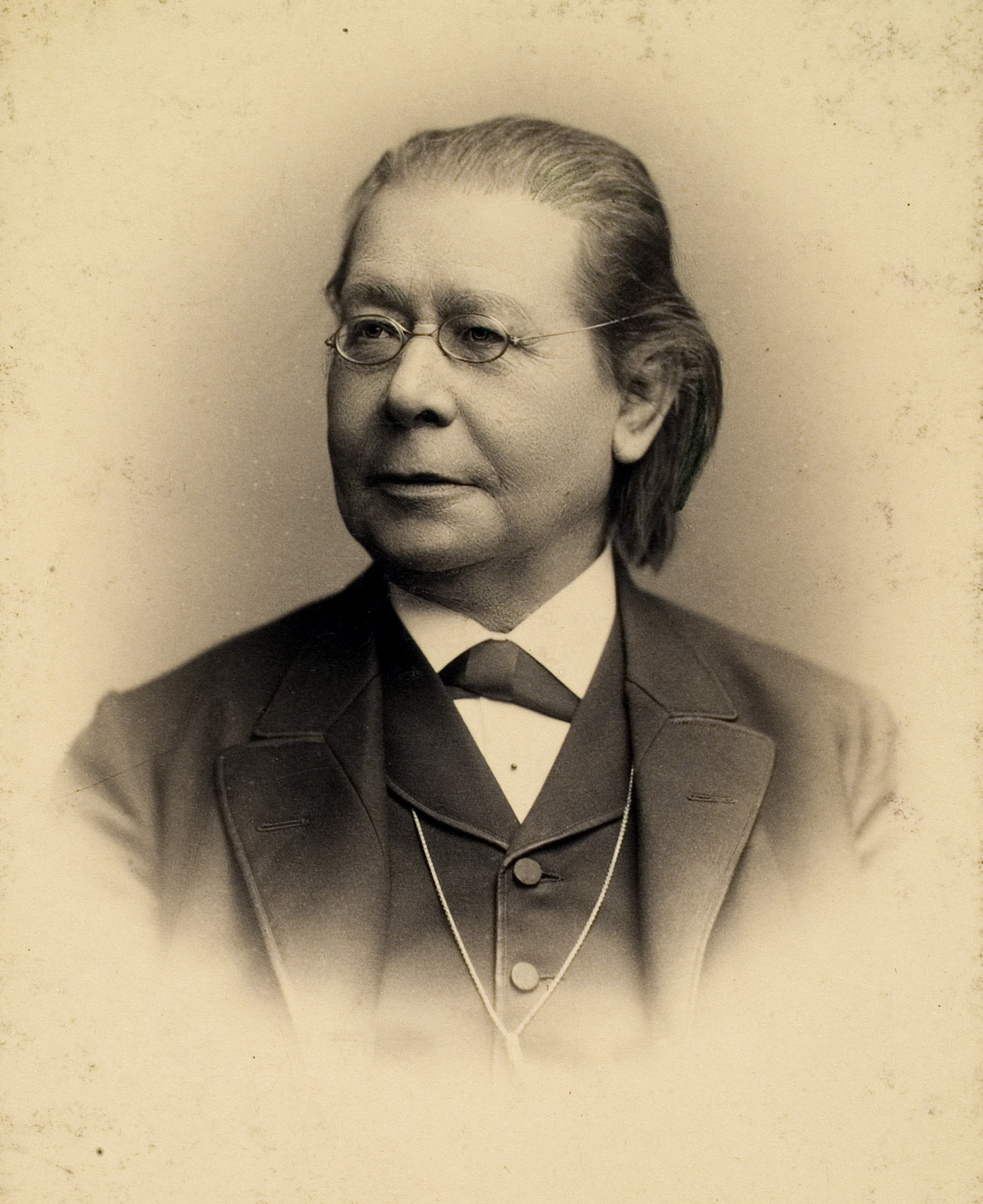
- Hermann Franz Moritz Kopp
- Born: 30 October 1817; Hanau, Hesse-Kassel, Germany
- Died: 20 February 1892 (aged 74); Heidelberg, Germany
- Education: University of Marburg; Heidelberg
- Known for: Boiling points Heat capacities Studies of the history of chemistry Kopp's law
- Scientific career
- Fields: Chemistry; History of chemistry
- Workplaces: University of Giessen; University of Heidelberg

Hermann Franz Moritz Kopp (30 October 1817 – 20 February 1892), German chemist, was born at Hanau, where his father, Johann Heinrich Kopp (1777–1858), a physician, was professor of chemistry, physics and natural history at the local lyceum.

After attending the gymnasium of his native town, he studied at Marburg and Heidelberg, and then, attracted by the fame of Liebig, went in 1839 to Gießen, where he became a privatdozent in 1841, and professor of chemistry twelve years later. In 1864 he was called to Heidelberg in the same capacity, and he remained there until his death.

Kopp devoted himself especially to physico-chemical inquiries, and in the history of chemical theory his name is associated with several of the most important correlations of the physical properties of substances with their chemical constitution. Much of his work was concerned with specific volumes, the conception of which he set forth in a paper published when he was only twenty-two years of age; and the principles he established have formed the basis of subsequent investigations in that subject, although his results have in some cases undergone modification.

Another question to which he gave much attention was the connection of the boiling point of compounds, organic ones in particular, with their composition. In addition to these and other laborious researches, Kopp was a prolific writer. In 1843–1847 he published a comprehensive History of Chemistry, in four volumes, to which three supplements were added in 1869–1875. The Development of Chemistry in Recent Times appeared in 1871–1874, and in 1886 he published a work in two volumes on Alchemy in Ancient and Modern Times.

Kopp, in studying heat capacities, found "that the molecular heat capacity of a solid compound is the sum of the atomic heat capacities of the elements composing it; the elements having atomic heat capacities lower than those required by the law of Dulong and Petit retain these lower values in their compounds."

In addition, Kopp wrote (1863) on theoretical and physical chemistry for the Graham-Otto Lehrbuch der Chemie, and for many years assisted Liebig in editing the Annalen der Chemie and the Jahresbericht.

He was elected as a member of the American Philosophical Society in 1882 and on 9 February 1896 the Manchester Literary and Philosophical Society awarded Kopp Honorary membership of the Society

== Works ==
- Beiträge zur Geschichte der Chemie . Vol. 1&2 . Vieweg, Braunschweig 1869 Digital edition by the University and State Library Düsseldorf
- Ansichten über die Aufgabe der Chemie und über die Grundbestandtheile der Körper bei den bedeutenden Chemikern von Geber bis G. E. Stahl : die Entdeckung der Zusammensetzung des Wassers . Vieweg, Braunschweig 1875 Digital edition by the University and State Library Düsseldorf
- Die Alchemie in älterer und neuerer Zeit : ein Beitrag zur Culturgeschichte . Vol. 1&2 . Winter, Heidelberg 1886 Digital edition by the University and State Library Düsseldorf
