= Pierre Louis Dulong =

French scientist (1785–1838)

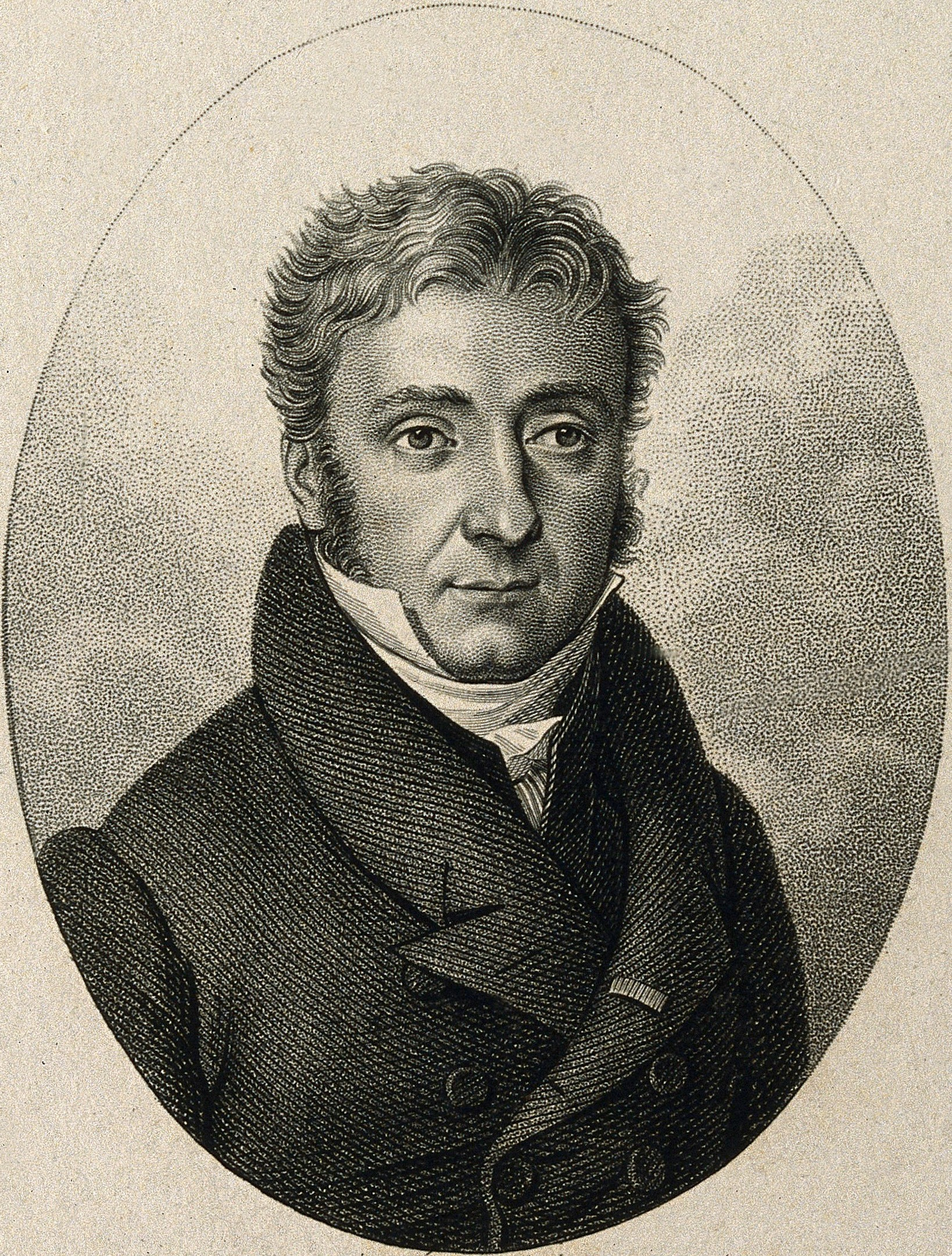
- Born: 12 February 1785; Rouen, France
- Died: 19 July 1838 (aged 53); Paris, France
- Education: École polytechnique
- Known for: Dulong–Petit law
- Scientific career
- Fields: Chemistry; Physics
- Workplaces: École polytechnique

Pierre Louis Dulong FRS FRSE (/duːˈlɒŋ, -ˈloʊŋ/; French: [dylɔ̃]; 12 February 1785 – 19 July 1838) was a French physicist and chemist. He is remembered today largely for the law of Dulong and Petit, although he was much-lauded by his contemporaries for his studies into the elasticity of steam, conduction of heat, and specific heats of gases. He worked most extensively on the specific heat capacity and the expansion and refractive indices of gases. His collaboration with Alexis Thérèse Petit led to the discovery of the Dulong–Petit law on heat capacity.

== Early life and education ==
Dulong was born in Rouen, France.

An only child, he was orphaned at the age of 4, he was brought up by his aunt in Auxerre. He gained his secondary education in Auxerre and the Lycée Pierre Corneille in Rouen before entering the École polytechnique, Paris in 1801, only for his studies to be impeded by poor health. He began studying medicine, but gave this up, possibly because of a lack of financial means, to concentrate on science, working under the direction of Louis Jacques Thénard.

== Career ==
In chemistry, he contributed to knowledge on:

- the double decomposition of salts (1811)
- nitrous acid (1815)
- the oxides of phosphorus (1816)
- the oxides of nitrogen
- catalysis by metals (1823, with Thénard).

Dulong also discovered the dangerously sensitive nitrogen trichloride in 1811, losing three fingers and an eye in the process. The fact that Dulong kept the accident a secret meant that Humphry Davy's investigation of the compound had the same unfortunate consequence, although Davy's injuries were less severe.

In addition to his accomplishments in chemistry, Dulong has been hailed as an interdisciplinary expert. His contemporaries in the Royal Society of London acknowledged his "command of almost every department of physical science".

In 1815, Dulong collaborated for the first time with Alexis Thérèse Petit, in publishing a paper on heat expansion. The two would continue to collaborate, researching the specific heats of metals. In 1819, Dulong and Petit showed that the mass heat capacity of metallic elements are inversely proportional to their atomic masses, this being now known as the Dulong–Petit law. For this discovery Dulong was honored by the French Academy in 1818. This law helped develop the periodic table and, more broadly, the examination of atomic masses.

In 1820, Dulong succeeded Petit, who retired due to poor health, as professor of physics at École polytechnique. Dulong studied the elasticity of steam, the measurement of temperatures, and the behavior of elastic fluids. He studied how metals enabled the combinations of certain gases. He made the first precise comparison of the mercury- and air-temperature scales. In 1830, he was elected a foreign member of the Royal Swedish Academy of Sciences.

He died of stomach cancer in Paris. At the time of his death, he was working on the development of precise methods in calorimetry. His last paper, published the year of his death, examined the heat released from chemical reactions.

== Personality ==
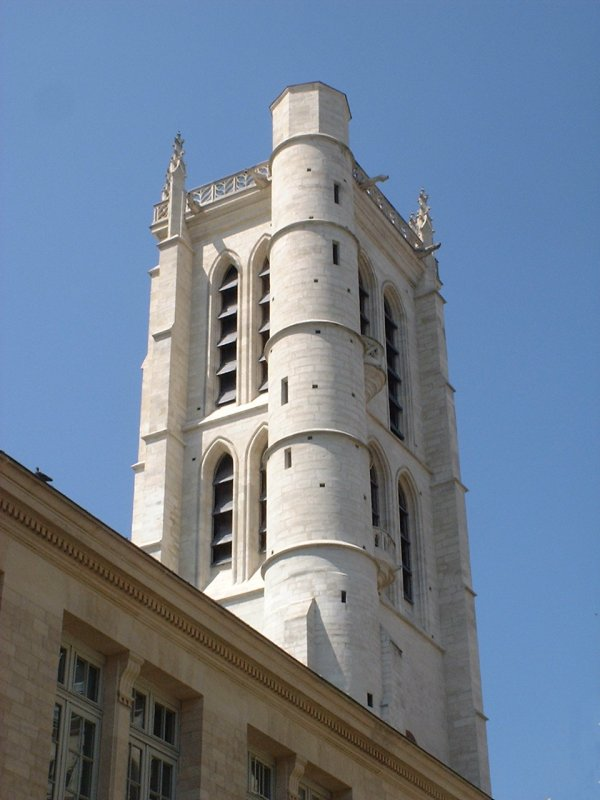
The modern-day Tour Clovis at the Abbey of St. Genevieve, the tower Dulong climbed to conduct his experiments on steam.

Socially, Dulong was often dismissed as a dry, standoffish individual. His few friends disagreed with this view, viewing his personality as subdued rather than dull.According to a fellow physicist who compared Dulong and Petit:

Petit had a lively intelligence, an elegant and easy speech, he seduced with an amiable look, got easily attached, and surrendered himself to his tendencies rather than governing them. He was credited with an instinctive scientific intuition, a power of premature invention, certain presages of an assured future that everyone foresaw and even desired, so great was the benevolence which he inspired. Dulong was the opposite: His language was thoughtful, his attitude serious and his appearance cold[. . . ] He worked slowly but with certainty, with a continuity and a power of will that nothing stopped, I should say with a courage that no danger could push back. In the absence of that vivacity of the mind which invents easily, but likes to rest, he had the sense of scientific exactness, the gusto for precision experiments, the talent of combining them, the patience of completing them, and the art, unknown before him, to carry them to the limits of accuracy[. . . ] Petit had more mathematical tendency, Dulong was more experimental; the first carried in the work more brilliant easiness, the second more continuity; One represented imagination, the other reason, which moderates and contains it.

— Jules Jamin (1855)

Dulong was noted both for his devotion to science and the stolid, almost casual, bravery he displayed in prosecuting his experiments. One such experiment involved the construction of a glass tubular apparatus atop the tower at the Abbey of Saint Genevieve. The tower was unsteady enough that an explosion of the experimental materials, considerably likely considering their volatility, could easily have toppled the tower and killed the researching physicists, including Dulong. The experiment though "full of danger and difficulty", was completed under Dulong's leadership.

Another example of Dulong's indifference to danger amid scientific pursuit came about in his studies into nitrogen trichloride. Despite losing two fingers and one eye in his initial experiments, Dulong continued to research the unknown substance. His inquiry led to more injuries, after which he turned over the results of his studies to Humphry Davy.

== Personal life ==
He was married to Emelie Augustine Riviere in 1803.

== Burial and honors ==
In life, Dulong poured the bulk of his finances into his scientific experiments. He was often destitute. As a result, he died without leaving his family any significant inheritance.

He is buried in Père Lachaise Cemetery. His monument was paid for by his scientific peers.

His is one of the names of 72 scientists inscribed on the Eiffel Tower.

== See also ==
- Hypophosphorous acid
- Phosphorus pentachloride
