= Dulong–Petit law =

Empirical thermodynamic law

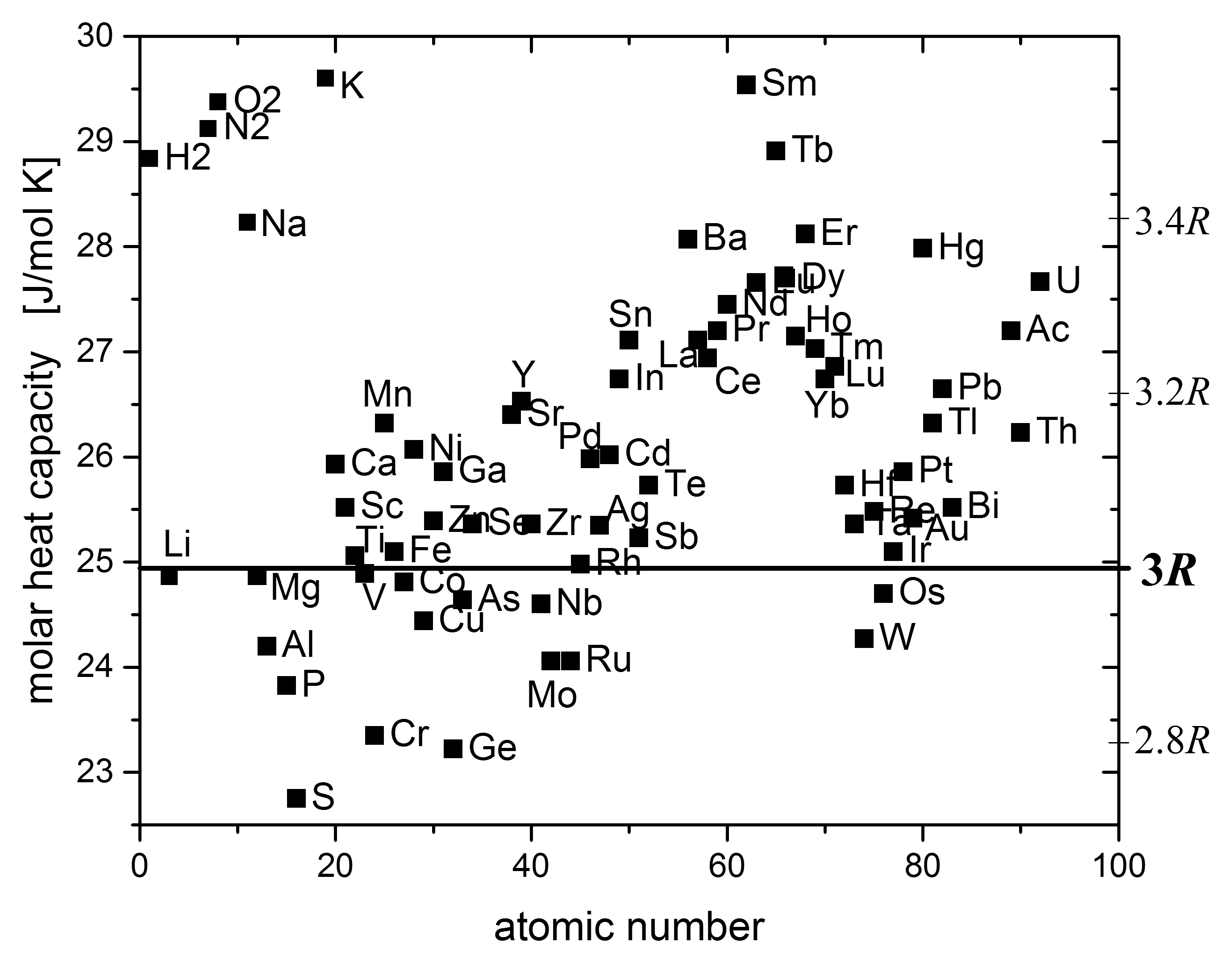
Molar heat capacity of most elements at 25 °C is in the range between 2.8 R and 3.4 R; plot as a function of atomic number with a y range from 22.5 to 30 J/(mol⋅K)

The Dulong–Petit law, a thermodynamic law proposed by French physicists Pierre Louis Dulong and Alexis Thérèse Petit in 1839, states that the classical expression for the molar heat capacity of certain chemical elements is constant for temperatures far from the absolute zero.

In modern terms, Dulong and Petit found that the heat capacity of a mole of many solid elements is about 3R, where R is the universal gas constant. The modern theory of the heat capacity of solids states that it is due to lattice vibrations in the solid.

The first theoretical proof of the law was given by Ludwig Boltzmann using statistical mechanics in 1877.

== History ==
Experimentally Pierre Louis Dulong and Alexis Thérèse Petit had found in 1819 that the heat capacity per weight (the mass-specific heat capacity) for 13 measured elements was close to a constant value, after it had been multiplied by a number representing the presumed relative atomic weight of the element. These atomic weights had shortly before been proposed by an atomic theory due to John Dalton and subsequently refined by Jacob Berzelius.

Dulong and Petit were unaware of the relationship with R, since this constant had not yet been defined from the later kinetic theory of gases. The value of 3R is about 25 joules per kelvin, and Dulong and Petit essentially found that this was the heat capacity of certain solid elements per mole of atoms they contained.

The Kopp's law developed in 1865 by Hermann Franz Moritz Kopp extended the Dulong–Petit law to chemical compounds from further experimental data.

Amedeo Avogadro remarked in 1833 that the law did not fit the experimental data of carbon samples. In 1876, Heinrich Friedrich Weber noticed that the specific heat of diamond was sensitive to temperature.

In 1877, Ludwig Boltzmann showed that the constant value of Dulong–Petit law could be explained in terms of independent classical harmonic oscillators. With the advent of quantum mechanics, this assumption was refined by Weber's student, Albert Einstein in 1907, employing quantum harmonic oscillators to explain the experimentally observed decrease of the heat capacity at low temperatures in diamond.

Peter Debye followed in 1912 with a new model based on Max Planck's photon gas, where the vibrations are not to individual oscillators but as vibrational modes of the ionic lattice. Debye model allowed to predict the behavior of the ionic heat capacity at temperature close to absolute zero, and as the Einstein solid, both recover the Dulong–Petit law at high temperature.

The electronic heat capacity was overestimated by the 1900 Drude–Lorentz model to be half of the value predicted by Dulong–Petit. With the development of the quantum-mechanical free electron model in 1927 by Arnold Sommerfeld the electronic contribution was found to be orders of magnitude smaller. This model explained why conductors and insulators have roughly the same heat capacity at large temperatures, as it depends mostly on the lattice and not on the electronic properties.

== Equivalent forms of statement of the law ==
An equivalent statement of the Dulong–Petit law in modern terms is that, regardless of the nature of the substance, the specific heat capacity c of a solid element (measured in joules per kelvin-kilogram) is equal to 3R/M, where R is the gas constant (measured in joules per kelvin-mole) and M is the molar mass (measured in kilograms per mole). Thus, the heat capacity per mole of many elements is 3R.

The initial form of the Dulong–Petit law was
$$cM = K,$$
where K is a constant which we know today is about 3R.

In modern terms, the mass m of the sample divided by molar mass M gives the number of moles n:
$$m/M = n.$$
Therefore, using uppercase C for the full heat capacity (in joules per kelvin), we have
$$C(M/m) = C/n = K = 3R,$$
or
$$C/n = 3R.$$
That is, the heat capacity of most solid crystalline substances is 3R per mole of substance.

Dulong and Petit did not state their law in terms of the gas constant R (which was not then known). Instead, they measured the values of heat capacities (per weight) of substances and found them smaller for substances of greater atomic weight as inferred by Dalton and other early atomists. Dulong and Petit then found that when multiplied by these atomic weights, the value for the heat capacity per mole was nearly constant and equal to a value which was later recognized to be 3R.

In other modern terminology, the dimensionless heat capacity C/(nR) is equal to 3.

The law can also be written as a function of the total number of atoms N in the sample:
$$C/N = 3k_\text{B},$$
where k_{B} is Boltzmann constant.

== Application limits ==
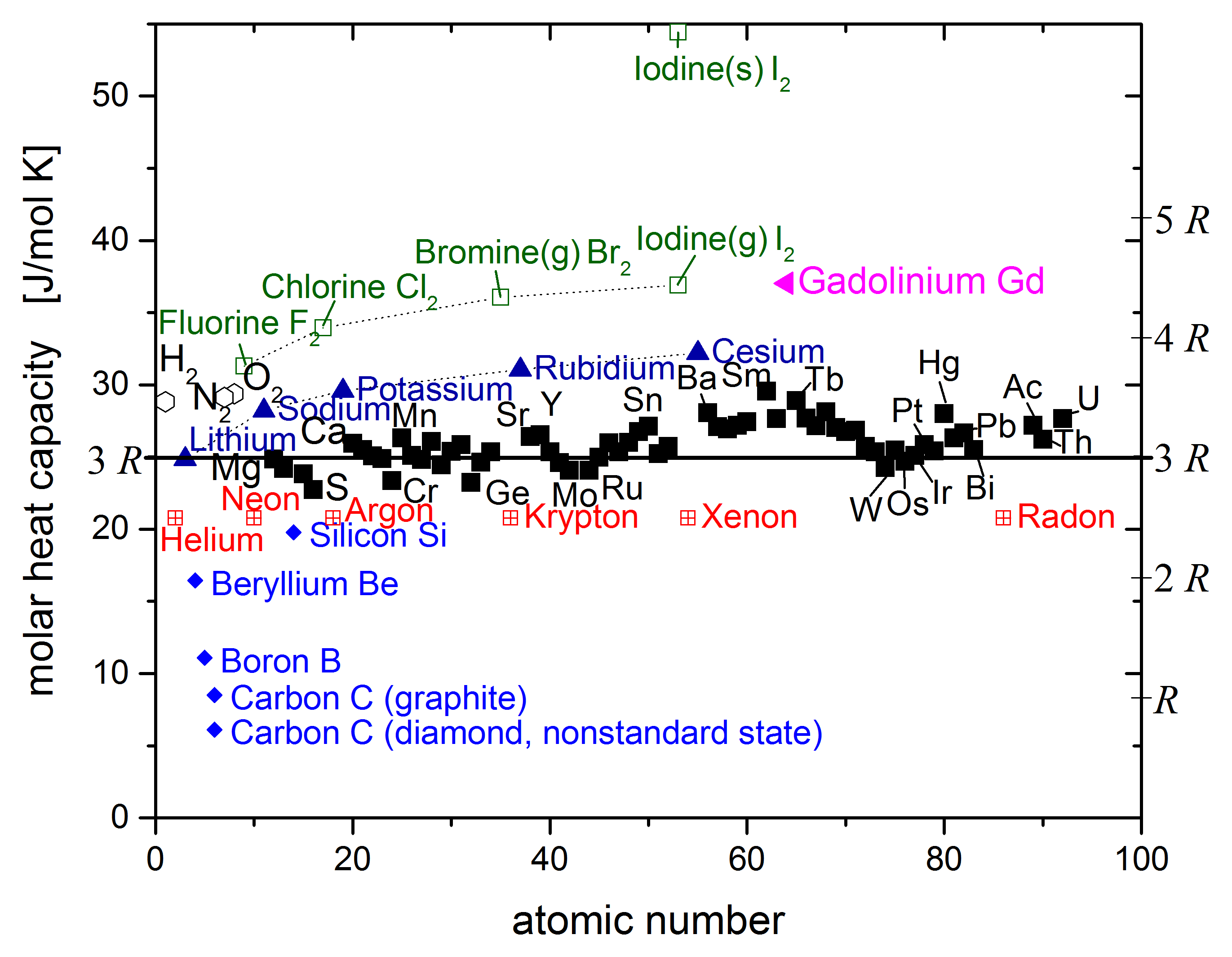
The molar heat capacity of most elements at 25 °C plotted as a function of atomic number. The value of bromine is for the gaseous state. For iodine, a value for the gas and one for the solid is shown. The excess in gadolinium is associated with the ferromagnetic transition near room temperature.

Despite its simplicity, Dulong–Petit law offers a fairly good prediction for the heat capacity of many elementary solids with relatively simple crystal structure at high temperatures. This agreement is because in the classical statistical theory of Ludwig Boltzmann, the heat capacity of solids approaches a maximum of 3R per mole of atoms because full vibrational-mode degrees of freedom amount to 3 degrees of freedom per atom, each corresponding to a quadratic kinetic-energy term and a quadratic potential-energy term. By the equipartition theorem, the average of each quadratic term is 1/2k_{B}T, or 1/2RT per mole (see derivation below). Multiplied by 3 degrees of freedom and the two terms per degree of freedom, this amounts to 3R molar heat capacity.

The Dulong–Petit law fails at room temperatures for light atoms bonded strongly to each other, such as in metallic beryllium and in carbon as diamond. Here, it predicts higher heat capacities than are actually found, with the difference due to higher-energy vibrational modes not being populated at room temperatures in these substances.

In the very low (cryogenic) temperature region, where the quantum-mechanical nature of energy storage in all solids manifests itself with larger and larger effect, the law fails for all substances. For crystals under such conditions, the Debye model, an extension of the Einstein theory that accounts for statistical distributions in atomic vibration when there are lower amounts of energy to distribute, works well.

== Derivation for an Einstein solid ==
A system of vibrations in a crystalline solid lattice can be modeled as an Einstein solid, i.e. by considering N quantum harmonic oscillator potentials along each degree of freedom. Then, the free energy of the system can be written as
$$F = N\varepsilon_0 + Nk_\text{B}T \sum_\alpha \ln\left(1 - e^{-\hbar\omega_\alpha/k_\text{B}T}\right),$$
where the index α sums over all the degrees of freedom. In the 1907 Einstein model (as opposed to the later Debye model), we consider only the high-energy limit:
$$k_\text{B}T \gg \hbar\omega_\alpha.$$
Then
$$1 - e^{-\hbar\omega_\alpha/k_\text{B}T} \approx \hbar\omega_\alpha/k_\text{B}T,$$
and we have
$$F = N\varepsilon_0 + Nk_\text{B}T \sum_\alpha \ln\left(\frac{\hbar\omega_\alpha}{k_\text{B}T}\right).$$

Define geometric mean frequency by
$$\ln \bar{\omega} = \frac{1}{g} \sum_\alpha \ln \omega_\alpha,$$
where g measures the total number of spatial degrees of freedom of the system. Then we have
$$F = N\varepsilon_0 - gNk_\text{B}T \ln k_\text{B}T + gNk_\text{B}T \ln \hbar\bar{\omega}.$$

Using energy
$$E = F - T\left(\frac{\partial F}{\partial T}\right)_V,$$
we have
$$E = N\varepsilon_0 + gNk_\text{B}T.$$
This gives heat capacity at constant volume
$$C_V = \left(\frac{\partial E}{\partial T}\right)_V = gNk_\text{B},$$
which is independent of the temperature.

For another more precise derivation, see Debye model.

== See also ==
- Heat capacity
- Kopp–Neumann law
