= Jules Jamin =

French physicist (1818–1886)

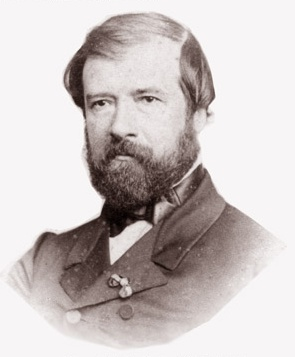
- Portrait of Jules Jamin cir. Unknown
- Born: 31 May 1818; Termes, France
- Died: 12 February 1886 (aged 67); France
- Known for: Jamin interferometer
- Awards: Rumford medal
- Scientific career
- Fields: Physics; Chemistry
- Workplaces: École polytechnique
- Thesis: Mémoire sur la réflexion métallique (1847)

Jules Célestin Jamin (31 May 1818 – 12 February 1886) was a French physicist. He was professor of physics at École polytechnique from 1852 to 1881 and received the Rumford Medal in 1858 for his work on light. He improved David Brewster's inclined interference plates with the development of the Jamin interferometer.

== Biography ==
=== Early life ===
Jules Jamin, son of Anthony Peter Jamin, was born in 1818 in Termes, Ardennes, France. He began his education at a small school in Vouziers, a small village located in northeast France. After some time there, he was sent to the college at Reims by his father, Antoine-Pierre. In his first year at the college at Reims Jules won nine awards. In 1838 he won the science competition award with honors, and in October of the same year he was accepted on first selection to enter École normale supérieure where he obtained a degree in physical sciences, mathematics and natural sciences. In 1841, he graduated first in the competition of comprehensive physical sciences. He obtained his first position at the college of Caen, where he succeeded Paul Desains. After two years, he joined the College Bourbon (today's Lycée Condorcet) as a substitute teacher, then in 1844, he joined the College Louis-le-Grand as a teacher.

=== Career ===
While in Caen, he began research in support of his thesis on the reflection of light on the surface of metals, for which in 1847 he received a doctorate in physics with his thesis on light reflection on metallic surfaces. From 1844 to 1854, Jamin studied and confirmed the conclusions of Macedonio Melloni concerning energy absorption alongside fellow physicists L. Courtépée and Antoine-Philibert Masson.

In 1852 he was appointed professor of physics at the École Polytechnique, a position he held until March 1881, when Alfred Potier succeeded him. In 1856 Jules Jamin began working on, and completed his well known instrument, the Jamin interferometer. In 1858 he was awarded the Rumford Medal, from the Royal Society, for his work on light and in 1863 he became a professor at the Faculty of Paris, succeeding César Despretz as the associate chair of experimental physics. Based on his lectures at the École polytechnique, he published a compelling paper titled "General essay on Physics".

On July 17, 1871, he presented Zénobe Gramme's invention of the electrical engine to the French Academy of Sciences.

In 1868, he joined the French Academy of Sciences and in the same year he created and headed the Physical Research Laboratory funded by the École pratique des hautes études of which he was also the principal of the studies division. In 1886, he handed off the title of Director of the Physical Research Laboratory to Gabriel Lippmann. Through the Academy of Sciences, Jamin was a member of one of many committees whose purpose was to organize the Loan Collection of Scientific Instruments, a massive exhibition of scientific artifacts from which the Museum of Science in London was eventually founded.

In 1882, with arrival of a new generation of physicists who came to do research for their doctorates, such as Gabriel Lippmann, Henri Pellat and Anatole Leduc, he replaced Henri Milne Edwards as Dean of the Faculty with Edmond Bouty becoming the deputy director of the laboratory. In the same year, he presided over the Academy of Sciences and became permanent secretary in 1884 succeeding Jean-Baptiste Dumas. Like many French scientists of the period, Jamin was known to perform scientific demonstrations in public with the goal of drawing enthusiastic crowds and gaining support for his work. Jamin was a staunch advocate of the movement in 19th century French towards precision measurement being essential for meaningful scientific experimentation.

Jules Jamin observed the solar eclipse of July 8, 1842 with mentoring from François Arago. This was also observed with Paul Laugier, Félix Mauvais, Jean Goujon, Hervé Faye, and Charles Mathieu.

== Research ==
Jamin interferometer

His work encompassed the subjects of magnetism, electricity, humidity, and capillary action (Jamin effect, Jamin chain). Other areas included the compressibility of liquids, the critical point of gases, specific heats, hygrometry, and the measurement of indices of refraction of gases, liquid water at different pressures, and of water vapor. In addition to the elliptical polarization of glassy substances, he discovered the negative elliptical polarization of fluorine. While he was a professor in Caen he would take his pupils on botanical and geologically focused expeditions on Sundays. In 1860 Jamin observed that when a cylindrical capillary tube was filled with a series ("chain") of alternating bubbles and water droplets, the chain remained immobile despite an increase or decrease of pressure at one end of the tube. See p. 173 of:

- Jamin, J. (1860). "Mémoire sur l'équilibre et le mouvement des liquides dans les corps poreux" [Memoir on equilibrium and the movement of liquids in porous bodies]. Comptes rendus (in French). 50: 172–176, 311–314, 385–389.

The "Jamin effect" has been more broadly defined as a resistance to flow in capillaries due to hysteresis of the contact angle, or to changes in the radius of the capillary, or to differences in the interfacial tension at the forward and trailing edges of bubbles.

- Calhoun, J. C. Jr. (1953). Fundamentals of Reservoir Engineering. Norman, Oklahoma, USA: University of Oklahoma Press. pp. 123–126.
- Taber, Joseph J. (1980). "Research on enhanced oil recovery: past, present and future". Pure and Applied Chemistry. 52 (5): 1323–1347. doi:10.1351/pac198052051323. S2CID 195819189. ; see p. 1324. In his work with optics, he discovered the elliptical polarization of light reflected from glassy substances in the vicinity of the angle of polarization, as predicted by Augustin-Louis Cauchy.

In 1873, Jamin invented a magnet with a layered design that allowed it to carry twenty-two times its own weight. At the time the greatest lifting capacity demonstrated for an artificial magnet was only four to five times its own weight. He also improved on the Yablachkov candle with his Jamin electric light, which he claimed "lights and relights itself as often as is required; only requires one circuit for all the neighboring candles; it replaces automatically those which are consumed, by new carbons; it employs no insulating material which might alter the color of the flame; and it requires no preliminary preparation of the carbons, which considerably diminishes the expense."

=== Works ===
Jules Jamin had a couple of articles that were published in Revue des Deux Mondes, a French magazine that was published in Paris. One article that Jamin had published was titled "La Physique Depuis Les Recherches D'Herschel: I. Melloni et ses Travaux sur la Chaleur Rayonnante", which translates to "Physics Since Herschel's Research: Melloni and His Work on Radiant Heat." This article was published on December 15 of 1854. The other article that Jamin wrote was titled "L'Optique et la Peinture," which translates as "Optics and Painting." This article was published on February 1 of 1857. Both of these articles were published during Jamin's time as the professor of physics at the École Polytechnique.

- La rosée, son histoire, son rôle (Dew, its history and its role), published in soft cover edition by VillaRrose Publishing 2004, ISBN 2-9510883-3-7 — an article of Jamin in Revue des Deux Mondes, January 15, 1879.
- Cours de physique de l'École Pólytechnique (Physics lessons from L'Ecole Polytechnique) publish by Gauthier-Villars, 1886.
- Petit Traité de Physique (à l'usage des établissements d'instruction, des aspirants aux baccalauréats et des candidats aux écoles de gouvernement). Gauthier-Villars, 1870.

== Personal life ==
He married at Reims in 1851, Theresa Josephine Eudoxia Lebrun (1832-1880), with whom he had a daughter, Lucie who was the wife of the physicist Henri Becquerel, and a son, a painter, Paul Jamin. Jamin was friends with Irish physicist John Tyndall, who offered to take care of his wife and children in Britain during the Franco-Prussian War. Jamin sent them instead to Brittany while he remained in Paris.

== Honors ==
Jules Jamin's name is one of the 72 names inscribed on the Eiffel Tower. His name is located on the side that faces Grenelle, a neighborhood located in the southwestern part of Paris.

Jamin's areas of interest were not confined entirely to the sciences. He enjoyed studying the work of distinguished artists at the Louvre and was a talented artist himself. His family is in possession of many of his paintings, as is the church in his native commune of Termes.

== Sources ==
- This article contains text from a document on the La vie rémoise site. and translated from the French Wikipedia article
