= Gas in a box =

Basic statistical model

In quantum mechanics, the results of the quantum particle in a box can be used to look at the equilibrium situation for a quantum ideal gas in a box which is a box containing a large number of particles which do not interact with each other except for instantaneous thermalizing collisions. This simple model can be used to describe the classical ideal gas as well as the various quantum ideal gases such as the ideal massive Fermi gas, the ideal massive Bose gas as well as black body radiation (photon gas) which may be treated as a massless Bose gas, in which thermalization is usually assumed to be facilitated by the interaction of the photons with an equilibrated mass.

Using the results from either Maxwell–Boltzmann statistics, Bose–Einstein statistics or Fermi–Dirac statistics, and considering the limit of a very large box, the Thomas–Fermi approximation (named after Enrico Fermi and Llewellyn Thomas) is used to express the degeneracy of the energy states as a differential, and summations over states as integrals. This enables thermodynamic properties of the gas to be calculated with the use of the partition function or the grand partition function. These results will be applied to both massive and massless particles. More complete calculations will be left to separate articles, but some simple examples will be given in this article.

== Thomas–Fermi approximation for the degeneracy of states ==
For both massive and massless particles in a box, the states of a particle are enumerated by a set of quantum numbers [n_{x}, n_{y}, n_{z}]. The magnitude of the momentum is given by

$$p=\frac{h}{2L}\sqrt{n_x^2+n_y^2+n_z^2} \qquad \qquad n_x,n_y,n_z=1,2,3,\ldots$$

where h is the Planck constant and L is the length of a side of the box. Each possible state of a particle can be thought of as a point on a 3-dimensional grid of positive integers. The distance from the origin to any point will be

$$n=\sqrt{n_x^2+n_y^2+n_z^2}=\frac{2Lp}{h}$$

Suppose each set of quantum numbers specify f states where f is the number of internal degrees of freedom of the particle that can be altered by collision. For example, a spin 1/2 particle would have f = 2, one for each spin state. For large values of n, the number of states with magnitude of momentum less than or equal to p from the above equation is approximately

$$g = \left(\frac{f}{8}\right)  \frac{4}{3}\pi n^3
= \frac{4\pi f}{3} \left(\frac{Lp}{h}\right)^3$$

which is just f times the volume of a sphere of radius n divided by eight since only the octant with positive n_{i} is considered. Using a continuum approximation, the number of states with magnitude of momentum between p and p + dp is therefore

$$dg = \frac{\pi}{2}~f n^2\,dn =  \frac{4\pi fV}{h^3}~ p^2\,dp$$

where V = L^{3} is the volume of the box. Notice that in using this continuum approximation, also known as Thomas−Fermi approximation, the ability to characterize the low-energy states is lost, including the ground state where n_{i} = 1. For most cases this will not be a problem, but when considering Bose–Einstein condensation, in which a large portion of the gas is in or near the ground state, the ability to deal with low energy states becomes important.

Without using any approximation, the number of particles with energy ε_{i} is given by

$$N_i = \frac{g_i}{\Phi(\varepsilon_i)}$$

where $g_i$ is the degeneracy of state i and
$$\Phi(\varepsilon_i) =
\begin{cases}
e^{\beta(\varepsilon_i-\mu)},  & \text{for particles obeying Maxwell-Boltzmann statistics} \\
e^{\beta(\varepsilon_i-\mu)}-1, & \text{for particles obeying Bose-Einstein statistics}\\
e^{\beta(\varepsilon_i-\mu)}+1, & \text{for particles obeying Fermi-Dirac statistics}\\
\end{cases}$$
with β = 1/k_{B}T, the Boltzmann constant k_{B}, temperature T, and chemical potential μ. (See Maxwell–Boltzmann statistics, Bose–Einstein statistics, and Fermi–Dirac statistics.)

Using the Thomas−Fermi approximation, the number of particles dN_{E} with energy between E and E + dE is:

$$dN_E= \frac{dg_E}{\Phi(E)}$$

where $dg_E$ is the number of states with energy between E and E + dE.

== Energy distribution ==
Using the results derived from the previous sections of this article, some distributions for the gas in a box can now be determined. For a system of particles, the distribution $P_A$ for a variable $A$ is defined through the expression $P_AdA$ which is the fraction of particles that have values for $A$ between $A$ and $A+dA$

$$P_A~dA = \frac{dN_A}{N} = \frac{dg_A}{N\Phi_A}$$

where

- $dN_A$, number of particles which have values for $A$ between $A$ and $A+dA$
- $dg_A$, number of states which have values for $A$ between $A$ and $A+dA$
- $\Phi_A^{-1}$, probability that a state which has the value $A$ is occupied by a particle
- $N$, total number of particles.

It follows that:

$$\int_A P_A~dA = 1$$

For a momentum distribution $P_p$, the fraction of particles with magnitude of momentum between $p$ and $p+dp$ is:

$$P_p~dp = \frac{Vf}{N}~\frac{4\pi}{h^3\Phi_p}~p^2dp$$

and for an energy distribution $P_E$, the fraction of particles with energy between $E$ and $E+dE$ is:

$$P_E~dE = P_p\frac{dp}{dE}~dE$$

For a particle in a box (and for a free particle as well), the relationship between energy $E$ and momentum $p$ is different for massive and massless particles. For massive particles,

$$E=\frac{p^2}{2m}$$

while for massless particles,

$$E = pc$$

where $m$ is the mass of the particle and $c$ is the speed of light. Using these relationships,

- For massive particles
  $$\begin{alignat}{2}
dg_E & = \quad \ \left(\frac{Vf}{\Lambda^3}\right)
\frac{2}{\sqrt{\pi}}~\beta^{3/2}E^{1/2}~dE \\
P_E~dE & = \frac{1}{N}\left(\frac{Vf}{\Lambda^3}\right)
\frac{2}{\sqrt{\pi}}~\frac{\beta^{3/2}E^{1/2}}{\Phi(E)}~dE \\
\end{alignat}$$
  where Λ is the thermal wavelength of the gas.
  $$\Lambda =\sqrt{\frac{h^2 \beta }{2\pi m}}$$
  This is an important quantity, since when Λ is on the order of the inter-particle distance $(V/N)^{1/3}$, quantum effects begin to dominate and the gas can no longer be considered to be a Maxwell–Boltzmann gas.
- For massless particles
  $$\begin{alignat}{2}
dg_E & = \quad \ \left(\frac{Vf}{\Lambda^3}\right)
\frac{1}{2}~\beta^3E^2~dE \\
P_E~dE & = \frac{1}{N}\left(\frac{Vf}{\Lambda^3}\right)
\frac{1}{2}~\frac{\beta^3E^2}{\Phi(E)}~dE \\
\end{alignat}$$
  where Λ is now the thermal wavelength for massless particles.
  $$\Lambda = \frac{ch\beta}{2\, \pi^{1/3}}$$

== Specific examples ==
The following sections give an example of results for some specific cases.

=== Massive Maxwell–Boltzmann particles ===
For this case:

$$\Phi(E)=e^{\beta(E-\mu)}$$

Integrating the energy distribution function and solving for N gives

$$N = \left(\frac{Vf}{\Lambda^3}\right)\,\,e^{\beta\mu}$$

Substituting into the original energy distribution function gives

$$P_E~dE = 2 \sqrt{\frac{\beta^3 E}{\pi}}~e^{-\beta E}~dE$$

which are the same results obtained classically for the Maxwell–Boltzmann distribution. Further results can be found in the classical section of the article on the ideal gas.

=== Massive Bose–Einstein particles ===
For this case:

$$\Phi(E)=\frac{e^{\beta E}}{z}-1$$

where $z=e^{\beta\mu}.$

Integrating the energy distribution function and solving for N gives the particle number

$$N = \left(\frac{Vf}{\Lambda^3}\right)\textrm{Li}_{3/2}(z)$$

where Li_{s}(z) is the polylogarithm function. The polylogarithm term must always be positive and real, which means its value will go from 0 to ζ(3/2) as z goes from 0 to 1. As the temperature drops towards zero, Λ will become larger and larger, until finally Λ will reach a critical value Λ_{c} where z = 1 and

$$N = \left(\frac{Vf}{\Lambda_{\rm c}^3}\right)\zeta(3/2),$$

where $\zeta(z)$ denotes the Riemann zeta function. The temperature at which Λ = Λ_{c} is the critical temperature. For temperatures below this critical temperature, the above equation for the particle number has no solution. The critical temperature is the temperature at which a Bose–Einstein condensate begins to form. The problem is, as mentioned above, that the ground state has been ignored in the continuum approximation. It turns out, however, that the above equation for particle number expresses the number of bosons in excited states rather well, and thus:

$$N=\frac{g_0 z}{1-z}+\left(\frac{Vf}{\Lambda^3}\right)\operatorname{Li}_{3/2}(z)$$

where the added term is the number of particles in the ground state. The ground state energy has been ignored. This equation will hold down to zero temperature. Further results can be found in the article on the ideal Bose gas.

=== Massless Bose–Einstein particles (e.g. black body radiation) ===
For the case of massless particles, the massless energy distribution function must be used. It is convenient to convert this function to a frequency distribution function:

$$P_\nu~d\nu = \frac{h^3}{N}\left(\frac{Vf}{\Lambda^3}\right)
\frac{1}{2}~\frac{\beta^3\nu^2}{e^{(h\nu-\mu)/k_{\rm B}T}-1}~d\nu$$

where Λ is the thermal wavelength for massless particles. The spectral energy density (energy per unit volume per unit frequency) is then

$$U_\nu~d\nu = \left(\frac{N\,h\nu}{V}\right) P_\nu~d\nu =  \frac{4\pi f h\nu^3 }{c^3}~\frac{1}{e^{(h\nu-\mu)/k_{\rm B}T}-1}~d\nu.$$

Other thermodynamic parameters may be derived analogously to the case for massive particles. For example, integrating the frequency distribution function and solving for N gives the number of particles:

$$N=\frac{16\,\pi V}{c^3h^3\beta^3}\,\mathrm{Li}_3\left(e^{\mu/k_{\rm B}T}\right).$$

The most common massless Bose gas is a photon gas in a black body. Taking the "box" to be a black body cavity, the photons are continually being absorbed and re-emitted by the walls. When this is the case, the number of photons is not conserved. In the derivation of Bose–Einstein statistics, when the restraint on the number of particles is removed, this is effectively the same as setting the chemical potential (μ) to zero. Furthermore, since photons have two spin states, the value of f is 2. The spectral energy density is then

$$U_\nu~d\nu = \frac{8\pi h\nu^3 }{c^3}~\frac{1}{e^{h\nu/k_{\rm B}T}-1}~d\nu$$

which is just the spectral energy density for Planck's law of black body radiation. Note that the Wien distribution is recovered if this procedure is carried out for massless Maxwell–Boltzmann particles, which approximates a Planck's distribution for high temperatures or low densities.

In certain situations, the reactions involving photons will result in the conservation of the number of photons (e.g. light-emitting diodes, "white" cavities). In these cases, the photon distribution function will involve a non-zero chemical potential. (Hermann 2005)

Another massless Bose gas is given by the Debye model for heat capacity. This model considers a gas of phonons in a box and differs from the development for photons in that the speed of the phonons is less than light speed, and there is a maximum allowed wavelength for each axis of the box. This means that the integration over phase space cannot be carried out to infinity, and instead of results being expressed in polylogarithms, they are expressed in the related Debye functions.

=== Massive Fermi–Dirac particles (e.g. electrons in a metal) ===
For this case:

$$\Phi(E)=e^{\beta(E-\mu)}+1.\,$$

Integrating the energy distribution function gives

$$N=\left(\frac{Vf}{\Lambda^3}\right)\left[-\textrm{Li}_{3/2}(-z)\right]$$

where again, Li_{s}(z) is the polylogarithm function and Λ is the thermal de Broglie wavelength. Further results can be found in the article on the ideal Fermi gas. Applications of the Fermi gas are found in the free electron model, the theory of white dwarfs and in degenerate matter in general.

== See also ==
- Gas in a harmonic trap
