= Bose gas =

State of matter of many bosons

An ideal Bose gas is a quantum-mechanical phase of matter, analogous to a classical ideal gas. It is composed of bosons, which have an integer value of spin and abide by Bose–Einstein statistics. The statistical mechanics of bosons were developed by Satyendra Nath Bose for a photon gas and extended to massive particles by Albert Einstein, who realized that an ideal gas of bosons would form a condensate at a low enough temperature, unlike a classical ideal gas. This condensate is known as a Bose–Einstein condensate.

== Introduction and examples ==
Bosons are quantum mechanical particles that follow Bose–Einstein statistics, or equivalently, that possess integer spin. These particles can be classified as elementary: these are the Higgs boson, the photon, the gluon, the W/Z and the hypothetical graviton; or composite like the atom of hydrogen, the atom of ^{16}O, the nucleus of deuterium, mesons etc. Additionally, some quasiparticles in more complex systems can also be considered bosons like the plasmons (quanta of charge density waves).

The first model that treated a gas with several bosons, was the photon gas, a gas of photons, developed by Bose. This model leads to a better understanding of Planck's law and the black-body radiation. The photon gas can be easily expanded to any kind of ensemble of massless non-interacting bosons. The phonon gas, also known as Debye model, is an example where the normal modes of vibration of the crystal lattice of a metal, can be treated as effective massless bosons. Peter Debye used the phonon gas model to explain the behaviour of heat capacity of metals at low temperature.

An interesting example of a Bose gas is an ensemble of helium-4 atoms. When a system of ^{4}He atoms is cooled down to temperature near absolute zero, many quantum mechanical effects are present. Below 2.17 K, the ensemble starts to behave as a superfluid, a fluid with almost zero viscosity. The Bose gas is the most simple quantitative model that explains this phase transition. Mainly when a gas of bosons is cooled down, it forms a Bose–Einstein condensate, a state where a large number of bosons occupy the lowest energy, the ground state, and quantum effects are macroscopically visible like wave interference.

The theory of Bose-Einstein condensates and Bose gases can also explain some features of superconductivity where charge carriers couple in pairs (Cooper pairs) and behave like bosons. As a result, superconductors behave like having no electrical resistivity at low temperatures.

The equivalent model for half-integer particles (like electrons or helium-3 atoms), that follow Fermi–Dirac statistics, is called the Fermi gas (an ensemble of non-interacting fermions). At low enough particle number density and high temperature, both the Fermi gas and the Bose gas behave like a classical ideal gas.

== Macroscopic limit ==
The thermodynamics of an ideal Bose gas is best calculated using the grand canonical ensemble. The grand potential for a Bose gas is given by:

$$\Omega=-kT \ln(\mathcal{Z}) = kT \sum_i g_i \ln\left(1-ze^{-\beta\epsilon_i}\right).$$

where each term in the sum corresponds to a particular single-particle energy level ε_{i}; g_{i} is the number of states with energy ε_{i}; z is the absolute activity (or "fugacity"), which may also be expressed in terms of the chemical potential μ by defining:

$$z(\beta,\mu)= e^{\beta \mu}$$

and β defined as:

$$\beta = \frac{1}{k_{\rm B}T}$$

where k_{B} is the Boltzmann constant and T is the temperature. All thermodynamic quantities may be derived from the grand potential and we will consider all thermodynamic quantities to be functions of only the three variables z, β (or T), and V. All partial derivatives are taken with respect to one of these three variables while the other two are held constant.

The permissible range of z is from negative infinity to +1, as any value beyond this would give an infinite number of particles to states with an energy level of 0 (it is assumed that the energy levels have been offset so that the lowest energy level is 0).

=== Macroscopic limit, result for uncondensed fraction ===
Pressure vs temperature curves of classical and quantum ideal gases (Fermi gas, Bose gas) in three dimensions. The Bose gas pressure is lower than an equivalent classical gas, especially below the critical temperature (marked with ★) where particles begin moving en masse into the zero-pressure condensed phase.

Following the procedure described in the gas in a box article, we can apply the Thomas–Fermi approximation, which assumes that the average energy is large compared to the energy difference between levels so that the above sum may be replaced by an integral. This replacement gives the macroscopic grand potential function $\Omega_m$, which is close to $\Omega$:

$$\Omega_{\rm m} = \int_0^\infty \ln\left(1-ze^{-\beta E}\right)\,dg \approx \Omega.$$

The degeneracy dg may be expressed for many different situations by the general formula:

$$dg = \frac{1}{\Gamma(\alpha)}\,\frac{E^{\,\alpha-1}}{ E_{\rm c}^{\alpha}} ~dE$$

where α is a constant, E_{c} is a critical energy, and Γ is the gamma function. For example, for a massive Bose gas in a box, α = 3/2 and the critical energy is given by:

$$\frac{1}{(\beta E_{\rm c})^\alpha}=\frac{Vf}{\Lambda^3}$$

where Λ is the thermal wavelength, and f is a degeneracy factor (f = 1 for simple spinless bosons). For a massive Bose gas in a harmonic trap we will have α = 3 and the critical energy is given by:

$$\frac{1}{(\beta E_c)^\alpha}=\frac{f}{(\hbar\omega\beta)^3}$$

where V(r) = mω^{2}r^{2}/2 is the harmonic potential. It is seen that E_{c} is a function of volume only.

This integral expression for the grand potential evaluates to:

$$\Omega_{\rm m} = -\frac{\textrm{Li}_{\alpha+1}(z)}{\left(\beta E_\text{c}\right)^\alpha},$$

where Li_{s}(x) is the polylogarithm function.

The problem with this continuum approximation for a Bose gas is that the ground state has been effectively ignored, giving a degeneracy of zero for zero energy. This inaccuracy becomes serious when dealing with the Bose–Einstein condensate and will be dealt with in the next sections. As will be seen, even at low temperatures the above result is still useful for accurately describing the thermodynamics of just the uncondensed portion of the gas.

=== Limit on number of particles in uncondensed phase, critical temperature ===
The total number of particles is found from the grand potential by

$$N_{\rm m} = -z\frac{\partial\Omega_m}{\partial z} = \frac{\textrm{Li}_\alpha(z)}{(\beta E_c)^\alpha}.$$

This increases monotonically with z (up to the maximum z = +1). The behaviour when approaching z = 1 is however crucially dependent on the value of α (i.e., dependent on whether the gas is 1D, 2D, 3D, whether it is in a flat or harmonic potential well).

For α > 1, the number of particles only increases up to a finite maximum value, i.e., N_{m} is finite at z = 1:

$$N_{\rm m, max} = \frac{\zeta(\alpha)}{(\beta E_{\rm c})^\alpha},$$

where ζ(α) is the Riemann zeta function (using Li_{α}(1) = ζ(α)). Thus, for a fixed number of particles N_{m}, the largest possible value that β can have is a critical value β_{c}. This corresponds to a critical temperature T_{c} = 1/k_{B}β_{c}, below which the Thomas–Fermi approximation breaks down (the continuum of states simply can no longer support this many particles, at lower temperatures). The above equation can be solved for the critical temperature:

$$T_{\rm c}=\left(\frac{N}{\zeta(\alpha)}\right)^{1/\alpha}\frac{E_{\rm c}}{k_{\rm B}}$$

For example, for the three-dimensional Bose gas in a box ($\alpha=3/2$ and using the above noted value of E_{c}) we get:

$$T_{\rm c}=\left(\frac{N}{Vf\zeta(3/2)}\right)^{2/3}\frac{h^2}{2\pi m k_{\rm B}}$$

For α ≤ 1, there is no upper limit on the number of particles (N_{m} diverges as z approaches 1), and thus for example for a gas in a one- or two-dimensional box (α = 1/2 and α = 1 respectively) there is no critical temperature.

=== Inclusion of the ground state ===
The above problem raises the question for α > 1: if a Bose gas with a fixed number of particles is lowered down below the critical temperature, what happens? The problem here is that the Thomas–Fermi approximation has set the degeneracy of the ground state to zero, which is wrong. There is no ground state to accept the condensate and so particles simply 'disappear' from the continuum of states. It turns out, however, that the macroscopic equation gives an accurate estimate of the number of particles in the excited states, and it is not a bad approximation to simply "tack on" a ground state term to accept the particles that fall out of the continuum:

$$N = N_0+ N_{\rm m} = N_0 + \frac{\textrm{Li}_\alpha(z)}{(\beta E_{\rm c})^\alpha}$$

where N_{0} is the number of particles in the ground state condensate.

Thus in the macroscopic limit, when T < T_{c}, the value of z is pinned to 1 and N_{0} takes up the remainder of particles. For T > T_{c} there is the normal behaviour, with N_{0} = 0. This approach gives the fraction of condensed particles in the macroscopic limit:

$$\frac{N_0}{N} =
\begin{cases}
1 - \left(\frac{T}{T_{\rm c}}\right)^\alpha &\mbox{if } \alpha > 1 \mbox{ and } T < T_{\rm c}, \\
0 & \mbox{otherwise}.
\end{cases}$$

=== Limitations of the macroscopic Bose gas model ===
The above standard treatment of a macroscopic Bose gas is straightforward, but the inclusion of the ground state is somewhat inelegant. Another approach is to include the ground state explicitly (contributing a term in the grand potential, as in the section below), this gives rise to an unrealistic fluctuation catastrophe: the number of particles in any given state follow a geometric distribution, meaning that when condensation happens at T < T_{c} and most particles are in one state, there is a huge uncertainty in the total number of particles. This is related to the fact that the compressibility becomes unbounded for T < T_{c}. Calculations can instead be performed in the canonical ensemble, which fixes the total particle number, however the calculations are not as easy.

Practically however, the aforementioned theoretical flaw is a minor issue, as the most unrealistic assumption is that of non-interaction between bosons. Experimental realizations of boson gases always have significant interactions, i.e., they are non-ideal gases. The interactions significantly change the physics of how a condensate of bosons behaves: the ground state spreads out, the chemical potential saturates to a positive value even at zero temperature, and the fluctuation problem disappears (the compressibility becomes finite). See the article Bose–Einstein condensate.

== Approximate behaviour in small gases ==
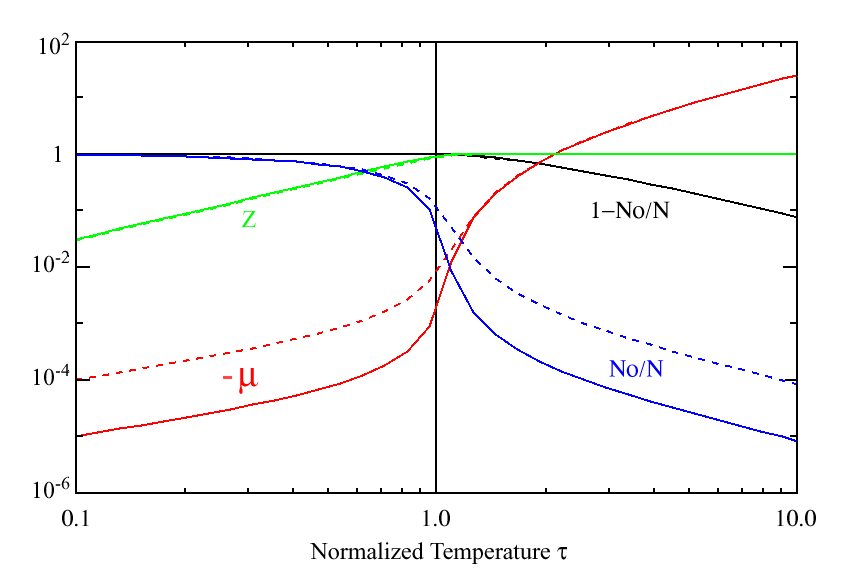
Figure 1: Various Bose gas parameters as a function of normalized temperature τ. The value of α is 3/2. Solid lines are for N = 10000, dotted lines are for N = 1000. Black lines are the fraction of excited particles, blue are the fraction of condensed particles. The negative of the chemical potential μ is shown in red, and green lines are the values of z. It has been assumed that k = ε_{c} = 1.

For smaller, mesoscopic, systems (for example, with only thousands of particles), the ground state term can be more explicitly approximated by adding in an actual discrete level at energy ε=0 in the grand potential:

$$\Omega = g_0\ln(1-z) + \Omega_{\rm m}$$

which gives instead N_{0} = g_{0}z/(1 − z). Now, the behaviour is smooth when crossing the critical temperature, and z approaches 1 very closely but does not reach it.

This can now be solved down to absolute zero in temperature. Figure 1 shows the results of the solution to this equation for α = 3/2, with k = ε_{c} = 1, which corresponds to a gas of bosons in a box. The solid black line is the fraction of excited states 1 − N_{0}/N for N = 10000 and the dotted black line is the solution for N = 1000. The blue lines are the fraction of condensed particles N_{0}/N. The red lines plot values of the negative of the chemical potential μ and the green lines plot the corresponding values of z. The horizontal axis is the normalized temperature τ defined by

$$\tau=\frac{T}{T_{\rm c}}$$

It can be seen that each of these parameters become linear in τ^{α} in the limit of low temperature and, except for the chemical potential, linear in 1/τ^{α} in the limit of high temperature. As the number of particles increases, the condensed and excited fractions tend towards a discontinuity at the critical temperature.

The equation for the number of particles can be written in terms of the normalized temperature as:

$$N = \frac{g_0\,z}{1-z}+N~\frac{\textrm{Li}_\alpha(z)}{\zeta(\alpha)}~\tau^\alpha$$

For a given N and τ, this equation can be solved for τ^{α} and then a series solution for z can be found by the method of inversion of series, either in powers of τ^{α} or as an asymptotic expansion in inverse powers of τ^{α}. From these expansions, we can find the behavior of the gas near T = 0 and in the Maxwell–Boltzmann as T approaches infinity. In particular, we are interested in the limit as N approaches infinity, which can be easily determined from these expansions.

This approach to modelling small systems may in fact be unrealistic, however, since the variance in the number of particles in the ground state is very large, equal to the number of particles. In contrast, the variance of particle number in a normal gas is only the square-root of the particle number, which is why it can normally be ignored. This high variance is due to the choice of using the grand canonical ensemble for the entire system, including the condensate state.

=== Thermodynamics ===
Expanded out, the grand potential is:

$$\Omega = g_0\ln(1-z)-\frac{\textrm{Li}_{\alpha+1}(z)}{\left(\beta E_{\rm c}\right)^\alpha}$$

All thermodynamic properties can be computed from this potential. The following table lists various thermodynamic quantities calculated in the limit of low temperature and high temperature, and in the limit of infinite particle number. An equal sign (=) indicates an exact result, while an approximation symbol indicates that only the first few terms of a series in $\tau^\alpha$ is shown.

Quantity	General	$T \ll T_c\,$	$T \gg T_c\,$
$z$		$\approx \frac{\zeta(\alpha)}{\tau^\alpha} -\frac{\zeta^2(\alpha)}{2^\alpha\tau^{2\alpha}}$	$=1\,$
Vapor fraction $1-\frac{N_0}{N}\,$	$=\frac{\textrm{Li}_{\alpha}(z)}{\zeta(\alpha)} \,\tau^\alpha$	$=\tau^\alpha\,$	$=1\,$
Equation of state $\frac{PV\beta}{N}= -\frac{\Omega}{N}\,$	$= \frac{\textrm{Li}_{\alpha\!+\!1}(z)}{\zeta(\alpha)}\,\tau^\alpha$	$= \frac{\zeta(\alpha\!+\!1)}{\zeta(\alpha)}\,\tau^\alpha$	$\approx 1-\frac{\zeta(\alpha)}{2^{\alpha\!+\!1}\tau^\alpha}$
Gibbs Free Energy $G=\ln(z)\,$	$=\ln(z)\,$	$=0\,$	$\approx \ln\left(\frac{\zeta(\alpha)}{\tau^\alpha}\right) -\frac{\zeta(\alpha)}{2^{\alpha}\tau^\alpha}$

It is seen that all quantities approach the values for a classical ideal gas in the limit of large temperature. The above values can be used to calculate other thermodynamic quantities. For example, the relationship between internal energy and the product of pressure and volume is the same as that for a classical ideal gas over all temperatures:

$$U=\frac{\partial \Omega}{\partial \beta}=\alpha PV$$

A similar situation holds for the specific heat at constant volume

$$C_V=\frac{\partial U}{\partial T}=k_{\rm B}(\alpha+1)\,U\beta$$

The entropy is given by:

$$TS=U+PV-G\,$$

Note that in the limit of high temperature, we have

$$TS=(\alpha+1)+\ln\left(\frac{\tau^\alpha}{\zeta(\alpha)}\right)$$

which, for α = 3/2 is simply a restatement of the Sackur–Tetrode equation. In one dimension bosons with delta interaction behave as fermions, they obey Pauli exclusion principle. In one dimension Bose gas with delta interaction can be solved exactly by Bethe ansatz. The bulk free energy and thermodynamic potentials were calculated by Chen-Ning Yang. In one dimensional case correlation functions also were evaluated. In one dimension Bose gas is equivalent to quantum non-linear Schrödinger equation.

== See also ==
- Weakly interacting Bose gas
- Tonks–Girardeau gas
