= Photon gas =

Gas-like collection of photons

In physics, a photon gas is a gas-like collection of photons, which has many of the same properties of a conventional gas like hydrogen or neon – including pressure, temperature, and entropy. The most common example of a photon gas in equilibrium is the black-body radiation.

Photons are part of a family of particles known as bosons, particles that follow Bose–Einstein statistics and with integer spin. A gas of bosons with only one type of particle is uniquely described by three state functions such as the temperature, volume, and the number of particles. However, for a black body, the energy distribution is established by the interaction of the photons with matter, usually the walls of the container, and the number of photons is not conserved. As a result, the chemical potential of the black-body photon gas is zero at thermodynamic equilibrium. The number of state variables needed to describe a black-body state is thus reduced from three to two (e.g. temperature and volume).

== Thermodynamics of a black body photon gas ==
In a classical ideal gas with massive particles, the energy of the particles is distributed according to a Maxwell–Boltzmann distribution. This distribution is established as the particles collide with each other, exchanging energy (and momentum) in the process. In a photon gas, there will also be an equilibrium distribution, but photons do not collide with each other (except under very extreme conditions, see two-photon physics), so the equilibrium distribution must be established by other means. The most common way that an equilibrium distribution is established is by the interaction of the photons with matter. If the photons are absorbed and emitted by the walls of the system containing the photon gas, and the walls are at a particular temperature, then the equilibrium distribution for the photons will be a black-body distribution at that temperature.

A very important difference between a generic Bose gas (gas of massive bosons) and a photon gas with a black-body distribution is that the number of photons in the photon gas is not conserved. A photon can be created upon thermal excitation of an atom in the wall into an upper electronic state, followed by the emission of a photon when the atom falls back to a lower energetic state. This type of photon generation is called thermal emission. The reverse process can also take place, resulting in a photon being destroyed and removed from the gas. It can be shown that, as a result of such processes there is no constraint on the number of photons in the system, and the chemical potential of the photons must be zero for black-body radiation.

The thermodynamics of a black-body photon gas may be derived using quantum statistical mechanical arguments, with the radiation field being in equilibrium with the atoms in the wall. The derivation yields the spectral energy density u, which is the energy of the radiation field per unit volume per unit frequency interval, given by:
$$u(\nu, T) = \frac{8\pi h\nu^3}{c^3} ~ \frac{1}{e^\frac{h\nu}{kT} - 1},$$
where h is the Planck constant, c is the speed of light, ν is the frequency, k is the Boltzmann constant, and T is temperature.

Integrating over frequency and multiplying by the volume, V, gives the internal energy of a black-body photon gas:
$$U = \left(\frac{8\pi^5 k^4}{15(h c)^3}\right) V T^4.$$

The derivation also yields the (expected) number of photons N:
$$N = \left(\frac{16\pi k^3\zeta(3)}{(h c)^3}\right)VT^3,$$
where $\zeta(n)$ is the Riemann zeta function. Note that for a particular temperature, the particle number N varies with the volume in a fixed manner, adjusting itself to have a constant density of photons.

If we note that the equation of state for an ultra-relativistic quantum gas (which inherently describes photons) is given by
$$U = 3PV,$$
then we can combine the above formulas to produce an equation of state that looks much like that of an ideal gas:
$$PV = \frac{\zeta(4)}{\zeta(3)} NkT \approx 0.9\, NkT.$$

The following table summarizes the thermodynamic state functions for a black-body photon gas. Notice that the pressure can be written in the form $P=b T^4$, which is independent of volume (b is a constant).

Thermodynamic state functions for a black-body photon gas
	State function (T, V)
Internal energy	$U = \left(\frac{\pi^2 k^4}{15c^3\hbar^3}\right)\,VT^4 = \frac{4\sigma}{c}\,VT^4$
Particle number	$N = \left(\frac{2 k^3\zeta(3)}{\pi^2 c^3 \hbar^3 }\right)\,VT^3$
Chemical potential	$\mu = 0\,$
Pressure	$P = \frac{1}{3}\,\frac{U}{V} = \left(\frac{\pi^2 k^4}{45c^3\hbar^3}\right)\,T^4 = \frac{4\sigma}{3c}\,T^4$
Entropy	$S = \frac{4U}{3T}=\left(\frac{4\pi^2 k^4}{45c^3\hbar^3}\right)\,VT^3 = \frac{16\sigma}{3c}\,VT^3$
Enthalpy	$H = \frac{4}{3}\,U$
Helmholtz free energy	$A = -\frac{1}{3}\,U$
Gibbs free energy	$G = 0\,$

Within the table, $\hbar$ refers to the reduced Planck constant, i.e., $\hbar = h/2\pi$, and $\sigma$ refers to the Stefan–Boltzmann constant, $\frac{\pi^2 k^4}{60 c^2\hbar^3}$.

== Isothermal transformations ==
As an example of a thermodynamic process involving a photon gas, consider a cylinder with a movable piston. The interior walls of the cylinder are "black" in order that the temperature of the photons can be maintained at a particular temperature. This means that the space inside the cylinder will contain a blackbody-distributed photon gas. Unlike a massive gas, this gas will exist without the photons being introduced from the outside – the walls will provide the photons for the gas. Suppose the piston is pushed all the way into the cylinder so that there is an extremely small volume. The photon gas inside the volume will press against the piston, moving it outward, and in order for the transformation to be isothermic, a counter force of almost the same value will have to be applied to the piston so that the motion of the piston is very slow. This force will be equal to the pressure times the cross sectional area (A) of the piston. This process can be continued at a constant temperature until the photon gas is at a volume V_{0}. Integrating the force over the distance (x) traveled yields the total work done to create this photon gas at this volume
$$W = -\int_0^{x_0} P (A \mathrm{d}x) ,$$
where the relationship V = Ax has been used. Defining
$$b = \frac{8\pi^5 k^4}{15c^3 h^3}.$$

The pressure is
$$P(x) = \frac{bT^4}{3}\,.$$

Integrating, the work done is just
$$W = -\frac{bT^4 Ax_0}{3} = -\frac{bT^4 V_0}{3}.$$

The amount of heat that must be added in order to create the gas is
$$Q = U - W = H_0\,.$$
where H_{0} is the enthalpy at the end of the transformation. It is seen that the enthalpy is the amount of energy needed to create the photon gas.

== Photon gases with tunable chemical potential ==
In low-dimensional systems, for example in dye-solution filled optical microcavities with a distance between the resonator mirrors in the wavelength range where the situation becomes two-dimensional, also photon gases with tunable chemical potential can be realized. Such a photon gas in many respects behaves like a gas of material particles. One consequence of the tunable chemical potential is that at high phase space densities then Bose-Einstein condensation of photons is observed.

== See also ==
- Gas in a box – derivation of distribution functions for all ideal gases
- Bose gas
- Fermi gas
- Planck's law of black-body radiation – the distribution of photon energies as a function of frequency or wavelength
- Stefan–Boltzmann law – the total flux emitted by a black body
- Radiation pressure
