= Scale-free ideal gas =

Ideal gas with no physical scale

The scale-free ideal gas (SFIG) is a physical model assuming a collection of non-interacting elements with a stochastic proportional growth. It is the scale-invariant version of an ideal gas. Some cases of city-population, electoral results and cites to scientific journals can be approximately considered scale-free ideal gases.

In a one-dimensional discrete model with size-parameter k, where k_{1} and k_{M} are the minimum and maximum allowed sizes respectively, and v = dk/dt is the growth, the bulk probability density function F(k, v) of a scale-free ideal gas follows

$$F(k,v)=\frac{N}{\Omega k^2}\frac{\exp\left[-(v/k-\overline{w})^2/2\sigma_w^2\right]}{\sqrt{2\pi}\sigma_w},$$

where N is the total number of elements, Ω = ln k_{1}/k_{M} is the logarithmic "volume" of the system, $\overline{w}=\langle v/k \rangle$ is the mean relative growth and $\sigma_w$ is the standard deviation of the relative growth. The entropy equation of state is

$$S=N\kappa\left\{\ln\frac{\Omega}{N}\frac{\sqrt{2\pi}\sigma_w}{H'}+\frac{3}{2}\right\},$$

where $\kappa$ is a constant that accounts for dimensionality and $H'=1/M\Delta\tau$ is the elementary volume in phase space, with $\Delta\tau$ the elementary time and M the total number of allowed discrete sizes. This expression has the same form as the one-dimensional ideal gas, changing the thermodynamical variables (N, V, T) by (N, Ω,σ_{w}).

Zipf's law may emerge in the external limits of the density since it is a special regime of scale-free ideal gases.
