= Thermal de Broglie wavelength =

Physical quantity of ideal and quantum gases

In physics, the thermal de Broglie wavelength ($\lambda_\text{th}$, sometimes also denoted by $\Lambda$) is a measure of the uncertainty in location of a particle of thermodynamic average momentum in an ideal gas. It is roughly the average de Broglie wavelength of particles in an ideal gas at the specified temperature.

== Quantum-classical boundary ==
We can take the average interparticle spacing in the gas to be approximately (V/N)^{1/3} where V is the volume and N is the number of particles. When the thermal de Broglie wavelength is much smaller than the interparticle distance, the gas can be considered to be a classical or Maxwell–Boltzmann gas. On the other hand, when the thermal de Broglie wavelength is on the order of or larger than the interparticle distance, quantum effects will dominate and the gas must be treated as a Fermi gas or a Bose gas, depending on the nature of the gas particles. The critical temperature is the transition point between these two regimes, and at this critical temperature, the thermal wavelength will be approximately equal to the interparticle distance. That is, the quantum nature of the gas will be evident for
$$\displaystyle
\frac{V}{N\lambda_\text{th}^3} \le 1
\ , \text{ or }
\left( \frac{V}{N} \right)^{1/3} \le \lambda_\text{th}$$

i.e., when the interparticle distance is less than the thermal de Broglie wavelength; in this case the gas will obey Bose–Einstein statistics or Fermi–Dirac statistics, whichever is appropriate. This is for example the case for electrons in a typical metal at T = 300 K, where the electron gas obeys Fermi–Dirac statistics, or in a Bose–Einstein condensate. On the other hand, for
$$\displaystyle
\frac{V}{N\lambda_\text{th}^3} \gg 1
\ , \text{or} \
\left( \frac{V}{N} \right)^{1/3} \gg \lambda_\text{th}$$

i.e., when the interparticle distance is much larger than the thermal de Broglie wavelength, the gas will obey Maxwell–Boltzmann statistics. Such is the case for molecular or atomic gases at room temperature, and for thermal neutrons produced by a neutron source.

== Massive particles ==
For non-interacting particles with mass, the thermal de Broglie wavelength can be derived from the calculation of the partition function. Assuming a 1-dimensional box of length L, the partition function (using the energy states of the 1D particle in a box) is
$$Z = \sum_n \exp{\left(-\frac{E_n}{k_\text{B}T}\right)} = \sum_n \exp{\left(-\frac{h^2 n^2}{8 m L^2 k_\text{B} T}\right)} .$$

Since the energy levels are extremely close together, we can approximate this sum as an integral:
$$Z = \int_0^\infty \exp{\left(-\frac{h^2 n^2}{8m L^2 k_\text{B}T}\right)} dn = \sqrt{\frac{2\pi m k_\text{B} T}{h^2}} L \equiv \frac{L}{\lambda_\text{th}} .$$

Hence,
$$\lambda_\text{th} = \frac{h}{\sqrt{2\pi m k_\text{B} T}} ,$$
where $h$ is the Planck constant, m is the mass of a gas particle, $k_\text{B}$ is the Boltzmann constant, and T is the temperature of the gas. This can also be expressed using the reduced Planck constant $\hbar= \frac{h}{2\pi}$ as
$$\lambda_\text{th} = {\sqrt{\frac{2\pi\hbar^2}{ m k_\text{B}T}}} .$$

== Massless particles ==
For massless (or highly relativistic) particles, the thermal wavelength is defined as
$$\lambda_\text{th}= \frac{hc}{2 \pi^{1/3} k_\text{B} T} = \frac{\pi^{2/3}\hbar c}{ k_\text{B} T} ,$$

where c is the speed of light. As with the thermal wavelength for massive particles, this is of the order of the average wavelength of the particles in the gas and defines a critical point at which quantum effects begin to dominate. For example, when observing the long-wavelength spectrum of black body radiation, the classical Rayleigh–Jeans law can be applied, but when the observed wavelengths approach the thermal wavelength of the photons in the black body radiator, the quantum Planck's law must be used.

== General definition ==
A general definition of the thermal wavelength for an ideal gas of particles having an arbitrary power-law relationship between energy and momentum (dispersion relationship), in any number of dimensions, can be introduced. If n is the number of dimensions, and the relationship between energy (E) and momentum (p) is given by
$$E=ap^s$$
(with a and s being constants), then the thermal wavelength is defined as
$$\lambda_\text{th}=\frac{h}{\sqrt{\pi}}\left(\frac{a}{k_\text{B}T}\right)^{1/s}
\left[\frac{\Gamma(n/2+1)}{\Gamma(n/s+1)}\right]^{1/n} ,$$
where Γ is the Gamma function. This definition retains the following simple form for the chemical potential in the dilute (classical ideal gas) limit:

$$\mu = k_\text{B}T \ln \frac{(\lambda_\text{th})^n N}{g V},$$

for internal degeneracy g (such as spin degeneracy g = 2 for electrons), and also provides clean expressions for the thermodynamics of Fermi and Bose gases.

In particular, for a 3-D (n = 3) gas of massive or massless particles we have E = p^{2}/2m (a = 1/2m, s = 2) and E = pc (a = c, s = 1), respectively, yielding the expressions listed in the previous sections. Note that for massive non-relativistic particles (s = 2), the expression does not depend on n. This explains why the 1-D derivation above agrees with the 3-D case.

== Examples ==
Some examples of the thermal de Broglie wavelength at 298 K are given below.

Species	Mass (kg)	$\lambda_\text{th}$ (m)
Electron	9.1094×10^{−31}	4.3179×10^{−9}
Photon	0	1.6483×10^{−5}
H_{2}	3.3474×10^{−27}	7.1228×10^{−11}
O_{2}	5.3135×10^{−26}	1.7878×10^{−11}
