= Quantum concentration =

The quantum concentration n_{Q} is the particle concentration (i.e. the number of particles per unit volume) of a system where the interparticle distance is equal to the thermal de Broglie wavelength.

Quantum effects become appreciable when the particle concentration is greater than or equal to the quantum concentration, which is defined as:

$$n_{\rm Q}=\left(\frac{M k_\mathrm{B} T}{2 \pi \hbar^2}\right)^{3/2}$$

where:

- M is the mass of the particles in the system
- $k_\mathrm{B}$ is the Boltzmann constant
- T is the temperature as measured in kelvins
- $\hbar$ is the reduced Planck constant

The quantum concentration for room temperature protons is about 1/cubic-Angstrom.

As the quantum concentration depends on temperature, high temperatures will put most systems in the classical limit unless they have a very high density e.g. a White dwarf.

For an ideal gas the Sackur–Tetrode equation can be written in terms of the quantum concentration as

$$S(T,V,N)=N k_{\rm B}\left[\frac{5}{2}+\ln\left(\frac{n_{\rm Q}}{n}\right)\right]$$

== Derivation from the partition function of a monatomic ideal gas ==
The quantum concentration can be derived from the canonical partition function of an ideal gas particle with the free particle Hamiltonian. For a single particle in a box of volume $V$, the partition function in the classical limit is given by integrating over all momentum states:

$$Z_{\text{ideal,monatomic}} = \frac{1}{h^3} \int d^3\vec{r} \int d^3\vec{p} \, e^{-\beta \vec{p}^2/2m}$$

where $\beta = 1/(k_\mathrm{B} T)$, $m$ is the particle mass, and $h$ is the Planck constant. The factor $1/h^3$ accounts for the quantum density of states in phase space.

The spatial integral gives the volume $V$, while the momentum integral is evaluated in spherical coordinates:

$$Z_{\text{ideal,monatomic}} = V \left(\frac{1}{h^3}\right) \int_0^{2\pi} d\phi \int_0^{\pi} \sin\theta \, d\theta \int_0^{\infty} p^2 \, dp \, e^{-\beta p^2/2m}$$

The angular integrals give $4\pi$, and the radial momentum integral is a standard Gaussian integral:

$$\int_0^{\infty} p^2 \, e^{-\beta p^2/2m} dp = \frac{1}{2}\sqrt{\frac{\pi}{\beta^3}} (2m)^{3/2}$$

Combining these results:

$$Z_{\text{ideal,monatomic}} = V \left(\frac{1}{h^3}\right) (4\pi) \cdot \frac{1}{2}\left(\frac{2\pi m}{\beta}\right)^{3/2} = V \left(\frac{2\pi m k_\mathrm{B} T}{h^2}\right)^{3/2}$$

The quantum concentration is defined as the coefficient with units of inverse volume that relates the partition function to the volume:

$$Z_{\text{ideal,monatomic}} = V \cdot n_\mathrm{Q}$$
$$n_\mathrm{Q} \equiv \left(\frac{2\pi m k_\mathrm{B} T}{h^2}\right)^{3/2} = \left(\frac{m k_\mathrm{B} T}{2\pi\hbar^2}\right)^{3/2}$$

Note that, when $n>n_\mathrm{Q}$ we shall have energy quantization and the ideal gas approximation shall not hold no further.
