= Fermi gas =

Physical model of non-interacting fermions

A Fermi gas is an idealized model, an ensemble of many non-interacting fermions. Fermions are particles that obey Fermi–Dirac statistics, like electrons, protons, and neutrons, and, in general, particles with half-integer spin. These statistics determine the energy distribution of fermions in a Fermi gas in thermal equilibrium, and is characterized by their number density, temperature, and the set of available energy states. The model is named after the Italian physicist Enrico Fermi.

This physical model is useful for certain systems with many fermions. Some key examples are the behaviour of charge carriers in a metal, nucleons in an atomic nucleus, neutrons in a neutron star, and electrons in a white dwarf.

== Description ==
An ideal Fermi gas or free Fermi gas is a physical model assuming a collection of non-interacting fermions in a constant potential well. Fermions are elementary or composite particles with half-integer spin, thus follow Fermi–Dirac statistics. The equivalent model for integer spin particles is called the Bose gas (an ensemble of non-interacting bosons). At low enough particle number density and high temperature, both the Fermi gas and the Bose gas behave like a classical ideal gas.

By the Pauli exclusion principle, no quantum state can be occupied by more than one fermion with an identical set of quantum numbers. Thus a non-interacting Fermi gas, unlike a Bose gas, concentrates a small number of particles per energy. Thus a Fermi gas is prohibited from condensing into a Bose–Einstein condensate, although weakly-interacting Fermi gases might form a Cooper pair and condensate (also known as BCS-BEC crossover regime). The total energy of the Fermi gas at absolute zero is larger than the sum of the single-particle ground states because the Pauli principle implies a sort of interaction or pressure that keeps fermions separated and moving. For this reason, the pressure of a Fermi gas is non-zero even at zero temperature, in contrast to that of a classical ideal gas. For example, this so-called degeneracy pressure stabilizes a neutron star (a Fermi gas of neutrons) or a white dwarf star (a Fermi gas of electrons) against the inward pull of gravity, which would ostensibly collapse the star into a black hole. Only when a star is sufficiently massive to overcome the degeneracy pressure can it collapse into a singularity.

It is possible to define a Fermi temperature below which the gas can be considered degenerate (its pressure derives almost exclusively from the Pauli principle). This temperature depends on the mass of the fermions and the density of energy states.

The main assumption of the free electron model to describe the delocalized electrons in a metal can be derived from the Fermi gas. Since interactions are neglected due to screening effect, the problem of treating the equilibrium properties and dynamics of an ideal Fermi gas reduces to the study of the behaviour of single independent particles. In these systems the Fermi temperature is generally many thousands of kelvins, so in human applications the electron gas can be considered degenerate. The maximum energy of the fermions at zero temperature is called the Fermi energy. The Fermi energy surface in reciprocal space is known as the Fermi surface.

The nearly free electron model adapts the Fermi gas model to consider the crystal structure of metals and semiconductors, where electrons in a crystal lattice are substituted by Bloch electrons with a corresponding crystal momentum. As such, periodic systems are still relatively tractable and the model forms the starting point for more advanced theories that deal with interactions, e.g. using the perturbation theory.

== 1D uniform gas ==
The one-dimensional infinite square well of length L is a model for a one-dimensional box with the potential energy:
$$V(x) = \begin{cases}
0, & x_c-\tfrac{L}{2} < x <x_c+\tfrac{L}{2},\\
\infty, & \text{otherwise.}
\end{cases}$$

It is a standard model-system in quantum mechanics for which the solution for a single particle is well known. Since the potential inside the box is uniform, this model is referred to as 1D uniform gas, even though the actual number density profile of the gas can have nodes and anti-nodes when the total number of particles is small.

The levels are labelled by a single quantum number n and the energies are given by:

$$E_n = E_0 + \frac{\hbar^2 \pi^2}{2 m L^2} n^2.$$
where $E_0$ is the zero-point energy (which can be chosen arbitrarily as a form of gauge fixing), $m$ the mass of a single fermion, and $\hbar$ is the reduced Planck constant.

For N fermions with spin-1/2 in the box, no more than two particles can have the same energy, i.e., two particles can have the energy of $E_1$, two other particles can have energy $E_2$ and so forth. The two particles of the same energy have spin 1/2 (spin up) or −1/2 (spin down), leading to two states for each energy level. In the configuration for which the total energy is lowest (the ground state), all the energy levels up to n = N/2 are occupied and all the higher levels are empty.

Defining the reference for the Fermi energy to be $E_0$, the Fermi energy is therefore given by
$$E_{\mathrm{F}}^{(\text{1D})}=E_{n}-E_0=\frac{\hbar^2 \pi^2}{2 m L^2} \left(\left\lfloor \frac{N}{2} \right\rfloor\right)^2,$$
where $\left\lfloor \frac{N}{2} \right\rfloor$ is the floor function evaluated at n = N/2.

=== Thermodynamic limit ===
In the thermodynamic limit, the total number of particles N is so large that the quantum number n may be treated as a continuous variable. In this case, the overall number density profile in the box is indeed uniform.

The number of quantum states in the range $n_1 < n < n_1 + dn$ is:
$$D_n(n_1)\, dn = 2 \, dn\,.$$

Without loss of generality, the zero-point energy is chosen to be zero, with the following result:

$$E_n = \frac{\hbar^2 \pi^2}{2 m L^2} n^2 \implies dE = \frac{\hbar^2 \pi^2}{m L^2} n \, dn
= \frac{\hbar \pi}{L}\sqrt{\frac{2E}{m}} dn \,.$$

Therefore, in the range:
$$E_1=\frac{\hbar^2 \pi^2}{2 m L^2} n^2_1< E < E_1 + dE\,,$$
the number of quantum states is:
$$D_n(n_1) \, dn = 2\frac{dE}{dE/dn} = \frac{2}{\frac{\hbar^2 \pi^2}{m L^2}n} \, dE
\equiv D(E_1) \, dE\,.$$

Here, the degree of degeneracy is:

$$D(E)=\frac{2}{dE/dn}
=\frac{2L}{\hbar \pi}\sqrt{\frac{m}{2E}}
\,.$$

And the density of states is:

$$g(E)\equiv \frac{1}{L}D(E)=\frac{2}{\hbar \pi}\sqrt{\frac{m}{2E}}\,.$$

In modern literature, the above $D(E)$ is sometimes also called the "density of states". However, $g(E)$ differs from $D(E)$ by a factor of the system's volume (which is $L$ in this 1D case).

Based on the following formula:

$$\int^{E_\mathrm{F}}_{0} D(E) \, dE = N \,,$$

the Fermi energy in the thermodynamic limit can be calculated to be:

$$E_{\mathrm{F}}^{(\text{1D})}=\frac{\hbar^2 \pi^2}{2 m L^2} \left(\frac{N}{2}\right)^2\,.$$

== 3D uniform gas ==
A model of the atomic nucleus showing it as a compact bundle of the two types of nucleons: protons (red) and neutrons (blue). As a first approximation, the nucleus can be treated as composed of non-interacting proton and neutron gases.

The three-dimensional isotropic and non-relativistic uniform Fermi gas case is known as the Fermi sphere.

A three-dimensional infinite square well, (i.e. a cubical box that has a side length L) has the potential energy
$$V(x,y,z) = \begin{cases}
0, & -\frac{L}{2}<x,y,z<\frac{L}{2},\\
\infty, & \text{otherwise.}
\end{cases}$$

The states are now labelled by three quantum numbers n_{x}, n_{y}, and n_{z}. The single particle energies are
$$E_{n_x,n_y,n_z} = E_0 + \frac{\hbar^2 \pi^2}{2m L^2} \left( n_x^2 + n_y^2 + n_z^2\right) \,,$$
where n_{x}, n_{y}, n_{z} are positive integers. In this case, multiple states have the same energy (known as degenerate energy levels), for example $E_{211}=E_{121}=E_{112}$.

=== Thermodynamic limit ===
When the box contains N non-interacting fermions of spin-1/2, it is interesting to calculate the energy in the thermodynamic limit, where N is so large that the quantum numbers n_{x}, n_{y}, n_{z} can be treated as continuous variables.

With the vector $\mathbf{n}=(n_x,n_y,n_z)$, each quantum state corresponds to a point in 'n-space' with energy
$$E_{\mathbf{n}} = E_0 + \frac{\hbar^2 \pi^2}{2m L^2} |\mathbf{n}|^2 \,$$

With $|\mathbf{n}|^2$denoting the square of the usual Euclidean length $\left|\mathbf{n}\right| = \sqrt{n_x^2+n_y^2+n_z^2}$. The number of states with energy less than E_{F} + E_{0} is equal to the number of states that lie within a sphere of radius $|\mathbf{n}_{\mathrm{F}}|$ in the region of n-space where n_{x}, n_{y}, n_{z} are positive. In the ground state this number equals the number of fermions in the system:

$$N =2\times\frac{1}{8}\times\frac{4}{3} \pi n_{\mathrm{F}}^3$$

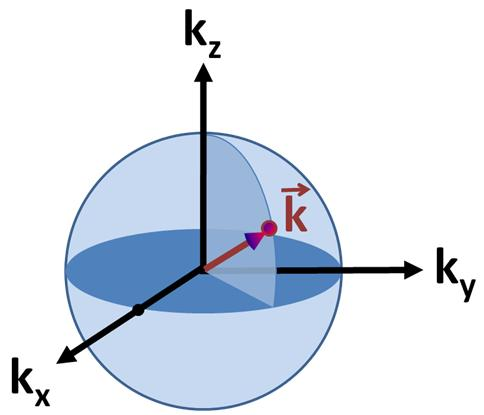
The free fermions that occupy the lowest energy states form a sphere in reciprocal space. The surface of this sphere is the Fermi surface.

The factor of two expresses the two spin states, and the factor of 1/8 expresses the fraction of the sphere that lies in the region where all n are positive.
$$n_{\mathrm{F}}=\left(\frac{3 N}{\pi}\right)^{1/3}$$
The Fermi energy is given by
$$E_{\mathrm{F}} = \frac{\hbar^2 \pi^2}{2m L^2} n_{\mathrm{F}}^2 = \frac{\hbar^2 \pi^2}{2m L^2} \left( \frac{3 N}{\pi} \right)^{2/3}$$

Which results in a relationship between the Fermi energy and the number of particles per volume (when L^{2} is replaced with V^{2/3}):

$E_{\mathrm{F}} = \frac{\hbar^2}{2m} \left( \frac{3 \pi^2 N}{V} \right)^{2/3}$

This is also the energy of the highest-energy particle (the $N$th particle), above the zero point energy $E_0$. The $N'$th particle has an energy of
$$E_{N'} = E_0 + \frac{\hbar^2}{2m} \left( \frac{3 \pi^2 N'}{V} \right)^{2/3} \,=E_0 + E_{\mathrm{F}} \big |_{N'}$$

The total energy of a Fermi sphere of $N$ fermions (which occupy all $N$ energy states within the Fermi sphere) is given by:

$$E_{\rm T} = N E_0 + \int_0^N E_{\mathrm{F}}\big |_{N'} \, dN' = \left(\frac{3}{5} E_{\mathrm{F}} + E_0\right)N$$

Therefore, the average energy per particle is given by:
$$E_\mathrm{av} = E_0 + \frac{3}{5} E_{\mathrm{F}}$$

=== Density of states ===
Density of states (DOS) of a Fermi gas in 3-dimensions

For the 3D uniform Fermi gas, with fermions of spin-1/2, the number of particles as a function of the energy $N(E)$ is obtained by substituting the Fermi energy by a variable energy $(E-E_0)$:

$$N(E)=\frac{V}{3\pi^2}\left[\frac{2m}{\hbar^2}(E-E_0)\right]^{3/2},$$

from which the density of states (number of energy states per energy per volume) $g(E)$ can be obtained. It can be calculated by differentiating the number of particles with respect to the energy:

$$g(E) =\frac{1}{V}\frac{\partial N(E)}{\partial E}= \frac {1}{2\pi^2} \left(\frac {2m}{\hbar^2}\right)^{3/2}\sqrt{E-E_0}.$$

This result provides an alternative way to calculate the total energy of a Fermi sphere of $N$ fermions (which occupy all $N$ energy states within the Fermi sphere):

$$\begin{align}
E_T &= \int_0^N E \, \mathrm{d} N(E) = E N(E)\big |_0^N-\int_{E_0}^{E_0+E_F} N(E) \, \mathrm{d} E \\
&=(E_0+E_F) N - \int_{0}^{E_F} N(E) \, \mathrm{d} (E-E_0) \\
&=(E_0+E_F)N - \frac{2}{5}E_FN(E_F)
= \left(E_0 + \frac{3}{5} E_{\mathrm{F}}\right)N
\end{align}$$

=== Thermodynamic quantities ===
==== Degeneracy pressure ====
Pressure vs temperature curves of classical and quantum ideal gases (Fermi gas, Bose gas) in three dimensions. Pauli repulsion in fermions (such as electrons) gives them an additional pressure over an equivalent classical gas, most significantly at low temperature.

By using the first law of thermodynamics, this internal energy can be expressed as a pressure, that is
$$P = -\frac{\partial E_{\rm T}}{\partial V} = \frac{2}{5}\frac{N}{V}E_{\mathrm{F}}= \frac{(3\pi^2)^{2/3}\hbar^2}{5m}\left(\frac{N}{V}\right)^{5/3},$$
where this expression remains valid for temperatures much smaller than the Fermi temperature. This pressure is known as the degeneracy pressure. In this sense, systems composed of fermions are also referred as degenerate matter.

Standard stars avoid collapse by balancing thermal pressure (plasma and radiation) against gravitational forces. At the end of the star lifetime, when thermal processes are weaker, some stars may become white dwarfs, which are only sustained against gravity by electron degeneracy pressure. Using the Fermi gas as a model, it is possible to calculate the Chandrasekhar limit, i.e. the maximum mass any star may acquire (without significant thermally generated pressure) before collapsing into a black hole or a neutron star. The latter, is a star mainly composed of neutrons, where the collapse is also avoided by neutron degeneracy pressure.

For the case of metals, the electron degeneracy pressure contributes to the compressibility or bulk modulus of the material.

==== Chemical potential ====
Chemical potential vs temperature curves of classical and quantum ideal gases (Fermi gas, Bose gas) in three dimensions.

Assuming that the concentration of fermions does not change with temperature, the total chemical potential μ (Fermi level) of the three-dimensional ideal Fermi gas is related to the zero temperature Fermi energy E_{F} by a Sommerfeld expansion (assuming $k_{\rm B}T \ll E_{\mathrm{F}}$):
$$\mu(T) = E_0 + E_{\mathrm{F}} \left[ 1- \frac{\pi ^2}{12} \left(\frac{k_{\rm B}T}{E_{\mathrm{F}}}\right) ^2 - \frac{\pi^4}{80} \left(\frac{k_{\rm B}T}{E_{\mathrm{F}}}\right)^4 + \cdots \right],$$
where T is the temperature.

Hence, the internal chemical potential, μ-E_{0}, is approximately equal to the Fermi energy at temperatures that are much lower than the characteristic Fermi temperature T_{F}. This characteristic temperature is on the order of 10^{5} K for a metal, hence at room temperature (300 K), the Fermi energy and internal chemical potential are essentially equivalent.

=== Typical values ===
==== Metals ====
Under the free electron model, the electrons in a metal can be considered to form a uniform Fermi gas. The number density $N/V$ of conduction electrons in metals ranges between approximately 10^{28} and 10^{29} electrons per m^{3}, which is also the typical density of atoms in ordinary solid matter. This number density produces a Fermi energy of the order:
$$E_{\mathrm{F}} = \frac{\hbar^2}{2m_e} \left( 3 \pi^2 \ 10^{28 \ \sim \ 29} \ \mathrm{m^{-3}} \right)^{2/3} \approx 2 \ \sim \ 10 \ \mathrm{eV},$$
where m_{e} is the electron rest mass. This Fermi energy corresponds to a Fermi temperature of the order of 10^{6} kelvins, much higher than the temperature of the Sun's surface. Any metal will boil before reaching this temperature under atmospheric pressure. Thus for any practical purpose, free electrons in a metal can be considered as a Fermi gas at zero temperature as an approximation (normal temperatures are small compared to T_{F}).

==== White dwarfs ====
Stars known as white dwarfs have mass comparable to the Sun, but have about a hundredth of its radius. The high densities mean that the electrons are no longer bound to single nuclei and instead form a degenerate electron gas. The number density of electrons in a white dwarf is of the order of 10^{36} electrons/m^{3}. This means their Fermi energy is:

$$E_{\mathrm{F}} = \frac{\hbar^2}{2m_e} \left( \frac{3 \pi^2 (10^{36})}{1 \ \mathrm{m^3}} \right)^{2/3} \approx 3 \times 10^5 \ \mathrm{eV} = 0.3 \ \mathrm{MeV}$$

==== Nucleus ====
Another typical example is that of the particles in a nucleus of an atom. The radius of the nucleus is roughly:
$$R = \left(1.25 \times 10^{-15} \mathrm{m} \right) \times A^{1/3}$$
where A is the number of nucleons.

The number density of nucleons in a nucleus is therefore:

$$\rho = \frac{A}{ \frac{4}{3} \pi R^3} \approx 1.2 \times 10^{44} \ \mathrm{m^{-3}}$$

This density must be divided by two, because the Fermi energy only applies to fermions of the same type. The presence of neutrons does not affect the Fermi energy of the protons in the nucleus, and vice versa.

The Fermi energy of a nucleus is approximately:
$$E_{\mathrm{F}} = \frac{\hbar^2}{2m_{\rm p}} \left( \frac{3 \pi^2 (6 \times 10^{43})}{1 \ \mathrm{m}^3} \right)^{2/3} \approx 3 \times 10^7 \ \mathrm{eV} = 30 \ \mathrm{MeV} ,$$
where m_{p} is the proton mass.

The radius of the nucleus admits deviations around the value mentioned above, so a typical value for the Fermi energy is usually given as 38 MeV.

== Arbitrary-dimensional uniform gas ==
=== Density of states ===
Using a volume integral on $d$ dimensions, the density of states is:

$$g^{(d)}(E)=g_s \int\frac{\mathrm{d}^d\mathbf{k}}{(2\pi)^d}\delta\left(E-E_0-\frac{\hbar^2|\mathbf{k}|^2}{2m}\right)=g_s\ \left(\frac{m}{2\pi\hbar^2}\right)^{d/2} \frac{(E-E_0)^{d/2-1}}{\Gamma(d/2)}$$

The Fermi energy is obtained by looking for the number density of particles:
$$\rho = \frac{N}{V} = \int_{E_0}^{E_0 + E_{\mathrm{F}}^{(d)}} g^{(d)}(E) \, dE$$

To get:
$$E_{\mathrm{F}}^{(d)} = \frac{2\pi\hbar^2}{m} \left(\frac{1}{g_s} \Gamma{\left(\tfrac{d}{2}+1\right)} \frac{N}{V}\right)^{2/d}$$
where $V$ is the corresponding d-dimensional volume, $g_s$ is the dimension for the internal Hilbert space. For the case of spin-1/2, every energy is twice-degenerate, so in this case $g_{s}=2$.

A particular result is obtained for $d=2$, where the density of states becomes a constant (does not depend on the energy):
$$g^{(2\mathrm{D})}(E) = \frac{g_s}{2}\frac{m}{\pi \hbar^2}.$$

== Fermi gas in harmonic trap ==
The harmonic trap potential:

$$V(x,y,z) = \frac{1}{2}m\omega_x^2x^2+\frac{1}{2}m\omega_y^2y^2+\frac{1}{2}m\omega_z^2z^2$$

is a model system with many applications in modern physics. The density of states (or more accurately, the degree of degeneracy) for a given spin species is:

$$g(E) = \frac{E^2}{2(\hbar\omega_\text{ho})^3}\,,$$

where $\omega_\text{ho}=\sqrt[3]{\omega_x\omega_y\omega_z}$ is the harmonic oscillation frequency.

The Fermi energy for a given spin species is:

$$E_{\rm F}=(6N)^{1/3}\hbar\omega_\text{ho}\,.$$

== Related Fermi quantities ==
Related to the Fermi energy, a few useful quantities also occur often in modern literature.

The Fermi temperature is defined as $T_{\mathrm{F}} = \frac{E_{\mathrm{F}}}{k_{\rm B}}$, where $k_{\rm B}$ is the Boltzmann constant. The Fermi temperature can be thought of as the temperature at which thermal effects are comparable to quantum effects associated with Fermi statistics. The Fermi temperature for a metal is a couple of orders of magnitude above room temperature. Other quantities defined in this context are Fermi momentum $p_{\mathrm{F}} = \sqrt{2 m E_{\mathrm{F}}}$, and Fermi velocity $v_{\mathrm{F}} = \frac{p_{\mathrm{F}}}{m}$, which are the momentum and group velocity, respectively, of a fermion at the Fermi surface. The Fermi momentum can also be described as $p_{\mathrm{F}} = \hbar k_{\mathrm{F}}$, where $k_{\mathrm{F}}$ is the radius of the Fermi sphere and is called the Fermi wave vector.

Note that these quantities are not well-defined in cases where the Fermi surface is non-spherical.

== Treatment at finite temperature ==
=== Grand canonical ensemble ===
Most of the calculations above are exact at zero temperature, yet remain as good approximations for temperatures lower than the Fermi temperature. For other thermodynamics variables it is necessary to write a thermodynamic potential. For an ensemble of identical fermions, the best way to derive a potential is from the grand canonical ensemble with fixed temperature, volume and chemical potential μ. The reason is due to Pauli exclusion principle, as the occupation numbers of each quantum state are given by either 1 or 0 (either there is an electron occupying the state or not), so the (grand) partition function $\mathcal{Z}$ can be written as

$$\mathcal{Z}(T,V,\mu)=\sum_{\{q\}}e^{-\beta (E_q-\mu N_q)}=\prod_{q}\sum_{n_q=0}^1e^{-\beta(\varepsilon_q-\mu )n_q}=\prod_q\left(1+e^{-\beta(\varepsilon_q-\mu )}\right),$$

where $\beta^{-1}=k_{\rm B}T$, $\{q\}$ indexes the ensembles of all possible microstates that give the same total energy $E_q = \sum_{q} \varepsilon_q n_q$ and number of particles $N_q=\sum_{q} n_q$, $\varepsilon_q$ is the single particle energy of the state $q$ (it counts twice if the energy of the state is degenerate) and $n_q=0,1$, its occupancy. Thus the grand potential is written as

$$\Omega(T,V,\mu)=-k_{\rm B}T\ln\left(\mathcal{Z}\right)=-k_{\rm B}T\sum_q\ln\left(1+e^{\beta(\mu-\varepsilon_q)}\right).$$

The same result can be obtained in the canonical and microcanonical ensemble, as the result of every ensemble must give the same value at thermodynamic limit $(N/V\rightarrow\infty)$. The grand canonical ensemble is recommended here as it avoids the use of combinatorics and factorials.

As explored in previous sections, in the macroscopic limit we may use a continuous approximation (Thomas–Fermi approximation) to convert this sum to an integral:
$$\Omega(T,V,\mu) = -k_{\rm B} T \int_{-\infty}^\infty D(\varepsilon) \ln \left(1 + e^{\beta(\mu-\varepsilon)} \right) \, d\varepsilon$$
where D(ε) is the total density of states.

=== Relation to Fermi–Dirac distribution ===
The grand potential is related to the number of particles at finite temperature in the following way
$$N=-\left(\frac{\partial \Omega}{\partial \mu}\right)_{T,V} = \int_{-\infty}^\infty D(\varepsilon) \mathcal{f}{\left(\frac{\varepsilon-\mu}{k_{\rm B}T}\right)} \,\mathrm{d}\varepsilon$$
where the derivative is taken at fixed temperature and volume, and it appears
$$\mathcal{f}(x)=\frac{1}{e^x+1}$$
also known as the Fermi–Dirac distribution.

Similarly, the total internal energy is
$$U = \Omega - T\left(\frac{\partial \Omega}{\partial T}\right)_{V,\mu} - \mu\left(\frac{\partial \Omega}{\partial \mu}\right)_{T,V} = \int_{-\infty}^\infty D(\varepsilon) \mathcal{f} \!\left(\frac{\varepsilon-\mu}{k_{\rm B}T}\right) \varepsilon\, d\varepsilon.$$

=== Exact solution for power-law density-of-states ===
Many systems of interest have a total density of states with the power-law form:
$$D(\varepsilon) = V g(\varepsilon) = \frac{V g_0}{\Gamma(\alpha)} (\varepsilon - \varepsilon_0)^{\alpha-1}, \qquad \varepsilon \geq \varepsilon_0$$
for some values of g_{0}, α, ε_{0}. The results of preceding sections generalize to d dimensions, giving a power law with:

- α = d/2 for non-relativistic particles in a d-dimensional box,
- α = d for non-relativistic particles in a d-dimensional harmonic potential well,
- α = d for hyper-relativistic particles in a d-dimensional box.

For such a power-law density of states, the grand potential integral evaluates exactly to:
$$\Omega(T,V,\mu) = - V g_0 (k_{\rm B}T)^{\alpha+1} F_{\alpha} \left( \frac{\mu - \varepsilon_0}{k_{\rm B}T} \right),$$
where $F_{\alpha}(x)$ is the complete Fermi–Dirac integral (related to the polylogarithm). From this grand potential and its derivatives, all thermodynamic quantities of interest can be recovered.

== Extensions to the model ==
=== Relativistic Fermi gas ===
Radius–mass relations for a model white dwarf, relativistic relation vs non-relativistic. The Chandrasekhar limit is indicated as M_{Ch}.

The article has only treated the case in which particles have a parabolic relation between energy and momentum, as is the case in non-relativistic mechanics. For particles with energies close to their respective rest mass, the equations of special relativity are applicable. Where single-particle energy is given by:
$$E = \sqrt{\left(pc\right)^2 + \left(mc^2\right)^2}.$$

For this system, the Fermi energy is given by:
$$E_{\mathrm{F}} = \sqrt{\left(p_{\mathrm{F}}c\right)^2 + \left(mc^2\right)^2} - mc^2 \approx p_{\mathrm{F}}c,$$
where the $\approx$ equality is only valid in the ultrarelativistic limit, and
$$p_{\mathrm{F}} = \hbar\left(\frac{1}{g_s} 6\pi^2 \frac{N}{V}\right)^{1/3}.$$

The relativistic Fermi gas model is also used for the description of massive white dwarfs which are close to the Chandrasekhar limit. For the ultrarelativistic case, the degeneracy pressure is proportional to $(N/V)^{4/3}$.

=== Fermi liquid ===
In 1956, Lev Landau developed the Fermi liquid theory, where he treated the case of a Fermi liquid, i.e., a system with repulsive, not necessarily small, interactions between fermions. The theory shows that the thermodynamic properties of an ideal Fermi gas and a Fermi liquid do not differ that much. It can be shown that the Fermi liquid is equivalent to a Fermi gas composed of collective excitations or quasiparticles, each with a different effective mass and magnetic moment.

== See also ==
- Bose gas
- Fermionic condensate
- Gas in a box
- Jellium
- Two-dimensional electron gas
