= Emma Darwin (novelist) =

English author

- Born: 8 April 1964 (age 62)
- Writing career
- Genre: historical fiction
- Notable works: The Mathematics of Love (2006); A Secret Alchemy (2008)

Emma L. Darwin (born 8 April 1964) is an English historical fiction author, writer of the novels The Mathematics of Love (2006) and A Secret Alchemy (2008) and various short stories. She is the great-great-granddaughter of Charles and Emma Darwin.

== Biography ==
Darwin was born and brought up in London. Her father was Henry Galton Darwin, a lawyer in the Foreign Office, son of Sir Charles Galton Darwin, grandson of Sir George Darwin, and great-grandson of Charles Darwin. Her mother Jane (née Christie), an English teacher, was the younger daughter of John Traill Christie. Darwin has two sisters; Carola and Sophia. Due to the parents' work, the family spent three years commuting between London and Brussels. The family spent many holidays on the Essex/Suffolk border, where much of her novel The Mathematics of Love is set. Darwin has lamented that any reviews of her work inevitably include references to her family background.

She read Drama at the University of Birmingham, and she spent some years in academic publishing. But when she had two small children, she started writing again, and eventually earned an MPhil in Writing at the University of Glamorgan (now the University of South Wales), where her tutor was novelist and poet Christopher Meredith. The novel she wrote for the degree became The Mathematics of Love, which was sold to Headline Review, as the first of a two-book deal. Meanwhile, she had found the form of a research degree so fruitful that she completed a PhD in Creative Writing at Goldsmiths' College in 2010, where her supervisor was Maura Dooley. Darwin now lives with her children in South East London.

The Mathematics of Love was shortlisted for the Commonwealth Writers Best First Book Award for the Europe and South Asia region.

In 2006, her short story Maura's Arm as awarded 3rd place in the Bridport Prize. Previously her story, Closing Time had been longlisted for the 2005 Bridport Prize. She also was highly commended for Nunc Dimittis in the Cadenza Magazine Competition March 2005. Her short story Russian Tea was 2004 Phillip Good Memorial Prize Runner Up, and was included in the 2006 Fish Short Histories Prize anthology.

In December 2025, she was a guest on the Off the Shelf podcast to discuss her 2025 novel The Bruegel Boy which was named one of the best Historical Fiction novels of 2025 by The Times.

== Publications ==
- The Mathematics of Love London: Headline Review (3 Jul 2006) ISBN 978-0-7553-3062-1 - paperback published in the UK 8 March 2007 ISBN 978-0-7553-3064-5. Published in the US ISBN 978-0-06-114027-3
- A Secret Alchemy London: Headline Review 13 Nov 2008 ISBN 978-0-7553-3065-2
- Get Started in Writing Historical Fiction (2016) Teach Yourself ISBN 978-1-4736-0966-2
- This is not a Book about Charles Darwin: A Writer's Journey through my Family (2019) Holland House Books ISBN 978-1-910688-64-9
- The Bruegel Boy (2025) Holland House Books ISBN 978-1739104771
