= Hollow Moon =

Speculation that the Moon is hollow

The Hollow Moon and the closely related Spaceship Moon are pseudoscientific hypotheses that propose that Earth's Moon is either wholly hollow or otherwise contains a substantial interior space. No scientific evidence exists to support the idea; seismic observations and other data collected since spacecraft began to orbit or land on the Moon indicate that it has a solid, differentiated interior, with a thin crust, extensive mantle, and a dense core which is significantly smaller (in relative terms) than Earth's.

While Hollow Moon hypotheses usually propose the hollow space as the result of natural processes, the related Spaceship Moon hypothesis holds that the Moon is an artifact created by an alien civilization; this belief usually coincides with beliefs in UFOs or ancient astronauts. This idea dates from 1970, when two Soviet authors published a short piece in the popular press speculating that the Moon might be "the creation of alien intelligence"; since then, it has occasionally been endorsed by conspiracy theorists like Jim Marrs and David Icke.

An at least partially hollow Moon has made many appearances in science fiction, the earliest being H. G. Wells' 1901 novel The First Men in the Moon, which borrowed from earlier works set in a Hollow Earth, such as Ludvig Holberg's 1741 novel Niels Klim's Underground Travels.

Both the Hollow Moon and Hollow Earth theories are now universally considered to be fringe or conspiracy theories.

== Claims and rebuttals ==
=== Density ===
The fact that the Moon is less dense than the Earth is advanced by conspiracy theorists as support for claims of a hollow Moon. The Moon's mean density is 3.3 g/cm^{3}, whereas the Earth's is 5.5 g/cm^{3}. Mainstream science argues this difference is due to the fact that the Earth's upper mantle and crust are less dense than its heavy, iron core.

=== The Moon rang like a bell ===
Between 1969 and 1977, seismometers installed on the Moon by the Apollo missions recorded moonquakes. The Moon was described as "ringing like a bell" during some of those quakes, specifically the shallow ones. This phrase was brought to popular attention in March 1970 in an article in Popular Science.

On November 20, 1969, Apollo 12 deliberately crashed the Ascent Stage of its Lunar Module onto the Moon's surface; NASA reported that the Moon rang 'like a bell' for almost an hour, leading to arguments that it must be hollow like a bell. Lunar seismology experiments since then have shown that the lunar body has shallow moonquakes that act differently from quakes on Earth, due to differences in texture, type and density of the planetary strata, but there is no evidence of any large empty space inside the body.

=== Vasin-Shcherbakov "spaceship" conjecture ===
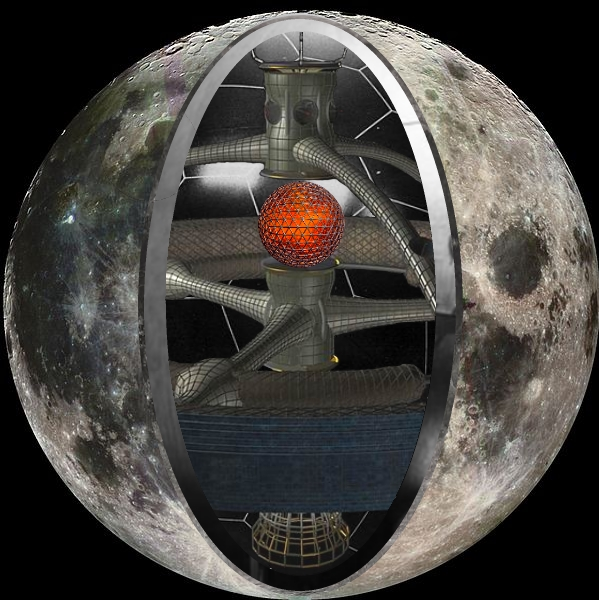
Speculative cutaway model of a Spaceship Moon

In 1970, Michael Vasin and Alexander Shcherbakov, of the Soviet Academy of Sciences, advanced a hypothesis that the Moon is a spaceship created by unknown beings. The article was titled "Is the Moon the Creation of Alien Intelligence?" and was published in Sputnik, the Soviet equivalent of Reader's Digest. The Vasin-Shcerbakov hypothesis was reported in the West that same year.

The authors reference earlier speculation by astrophysicist Iosif Shklovsky, who suggested that the Martian moon Phobos was an artificial satellite and hollow; this has since been shown not to be the case. Skeptical author Jason Colavito points out that all of their evidence is circumstantial, and that, in the 1960s, the atheistic Soviet Union promoted the ancient astronaut concept in an attempt to undermine the West's faith in religion.

=== "Perfect" solar eclipses ===
In 1965, author Isaac Asimov observed: "What makes a total eclipse so remarkable is the sheer astronomical accident that the Moon fits so snugly over the Sun. The Moon is just large enough to cover the Sun completely (at times) so that a temporary night falls and the stars spring out. […] The Sun's greater distance makes up for its greater size and the result is that the Moon and the Sun appear to be equal in size. […] There is no astronomical reason why Moon and Sun should fit so well. It is the sheerest of coincidence, and only the Earth among all the planets is blessed in this fashion."

Since the 1970s, conspiracy theorists have cited Asimov's observations on solar eclipses as evidence of the Moon's artificiality. Mainstream astronomers reject this interpretation. They note that the angular diameters of Sun and Moon vary by several percent over time and do not actually "perfectly" match during eclipses. Nor is Earth the only planet with such a satellite: Saturn's moon Prometheus has roughly the same angular diameter as the Sun when viewed from Saturn.

Some scholars have claimed that "the conditions required for perfect solar eclipses are the same conditions generally acknowledged to be necessary for intelligent life to emerge"; If so, the Moon's size and orbit might be best explained by the weak anthropic principle.

== Scientific perspective ==
Multiple lines of evidence demonstrate that the Moon is a solid body which formed from an impact between Earth and a planetoid.

=== Origin of the Moon ===
Historically, it was theorized that the Moon originated when a rapidly-spinning Earth expelled a piece of its mass. This was proposed by George Darwin (son of the famous biologist Charles Darwin) in 1879 and retained some popularity until Apollo. The Austrian geologist Otto Ampferer in 1925 also suggested the emerging of the Moon as cause for continental drift. A second hypothesis argued the Earth and the Moon formed together as a double system from the primordial accretion disk of the Solar System. Finally, a third hypothesis suggested that the Moon may have been a planetoid captured by Earth's gravity.

The modern explanation for the origin of the Moon is usually the giant-impact hypothesis, which argues a Mars-sized body struck the Earth, making a debris ring that eventually collected into a single natural satellite, the Moon. The giant-impact hypothesis is currently the favored scientific hypothesis for the formation of the Moon.

=== Internal structure ===
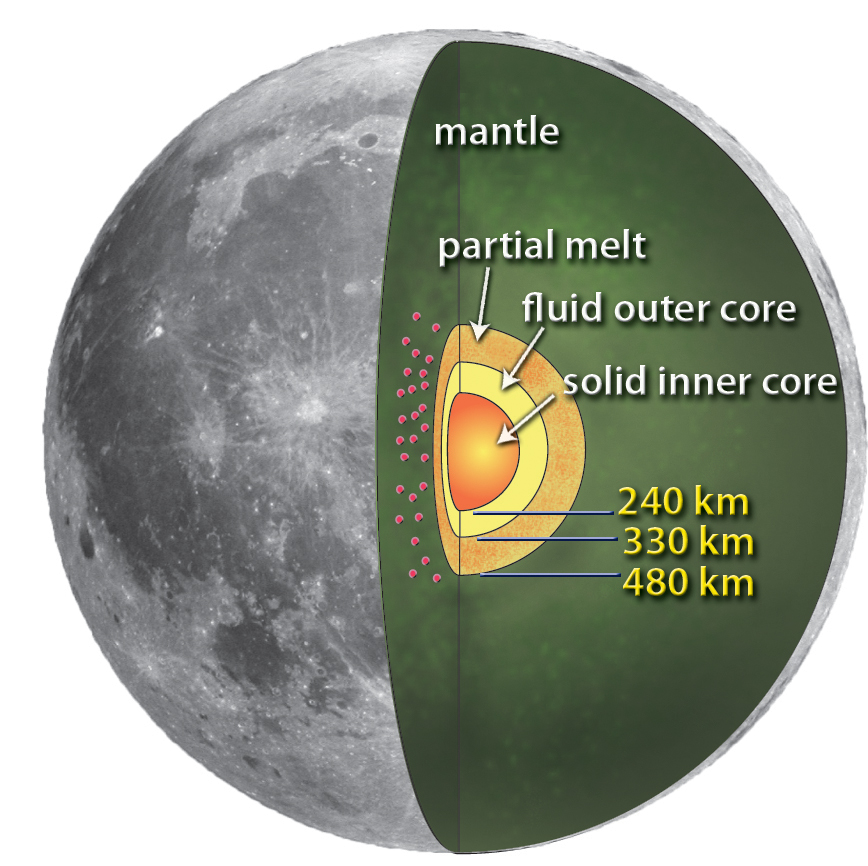
Schematic cross-section of the internal structure of the Moon

Multiple lines of evidence disprove that the Moon is hollow. One involves moment of inertia parameters; the other involves seismic observations. The moment of inertia parameters indicate that the core of the Moon is both dense and small, with the rest of the Moon consisting of material with nearly-constant density. Seismic observations have been made, constraining the thickness of the Moon's crust, mantle and core, demonstrating it could not be hollow.

Mainstream scientific opinion on the internal structure of the Moon overwhelmingly supports a solid internal structure with a thin crust, an extensive mantle and a small denser core.

==== Moment of inertia factor ====
Body	Moment of inertia factor
Hollow Sphere	0.67
Uniform Sphere	0.4
Denser at Core	< 0.4
Moon	0.39
Earth	0.33
All Mass at Core	0.0

The moment of inertia factor is a number, ranging from 0 to .67, that represents the distribution of mass in a spherical body. A moment of inertia factor of 0 represents a body with all its mass concentrated at its central core, while a factor of .67 represents a perfectly hollow sphere. A moment of inertia factor of 0.4 corresponds to a sphere of uniform density, while factors less than 0.4 represent bodies with cores that are more dense than their surfaces. The Earth, with its dense inner core, has a moment of inertia factor of 0.3307

In 1965, astronomer Wallace John Eckert attempted to calculate the lunar moment of inertia factor using a novel analysis of the Moon's perigee and node. His calculations suggested the Moon might be hollow, a result Eckert rejected as absurd. By 1968, other methods had allowed the Moon's moment of inertia factor to be accurately calculated at its accepted value.

From 1969 to 1973, five retroreflectors were installed on the Moon during the Apollo program (11, 14, and 15) and Lunokhod 1 and 2 missions. These reflectors made it possible to measure the distance between the surfaces of the Earth and the Moon using extremely precise laser ranging. True (physical) libration of the Moon measured via Lunar laser ranging constrains the moment of inertia factor to 0.394 ± 0.002. This is very close to the value for a solid object with radially constant density, which would be 0.4.

==== Seismic activity ====
From 1969 through 1972, Apollo astronauts installed several seismographic measuring systems on the Moon and their data made available to scientists (such as those from the Apollo Lunar Surface Experiments Package). The Apollo 11 instrument functioned through August of the landing year. The instruments placed by the Apollo 12, 14, 15, and 16 missions were functional until they were switched off in 1977.

The existence of moonquakes was an unexpected discovery from seismometers. Analysis of lunar seismic data has helped constrain the thickness of the crust (~45 km) and mantle, as well as the core radius (~330 km).

==== Doppler Gravity Experiment ====
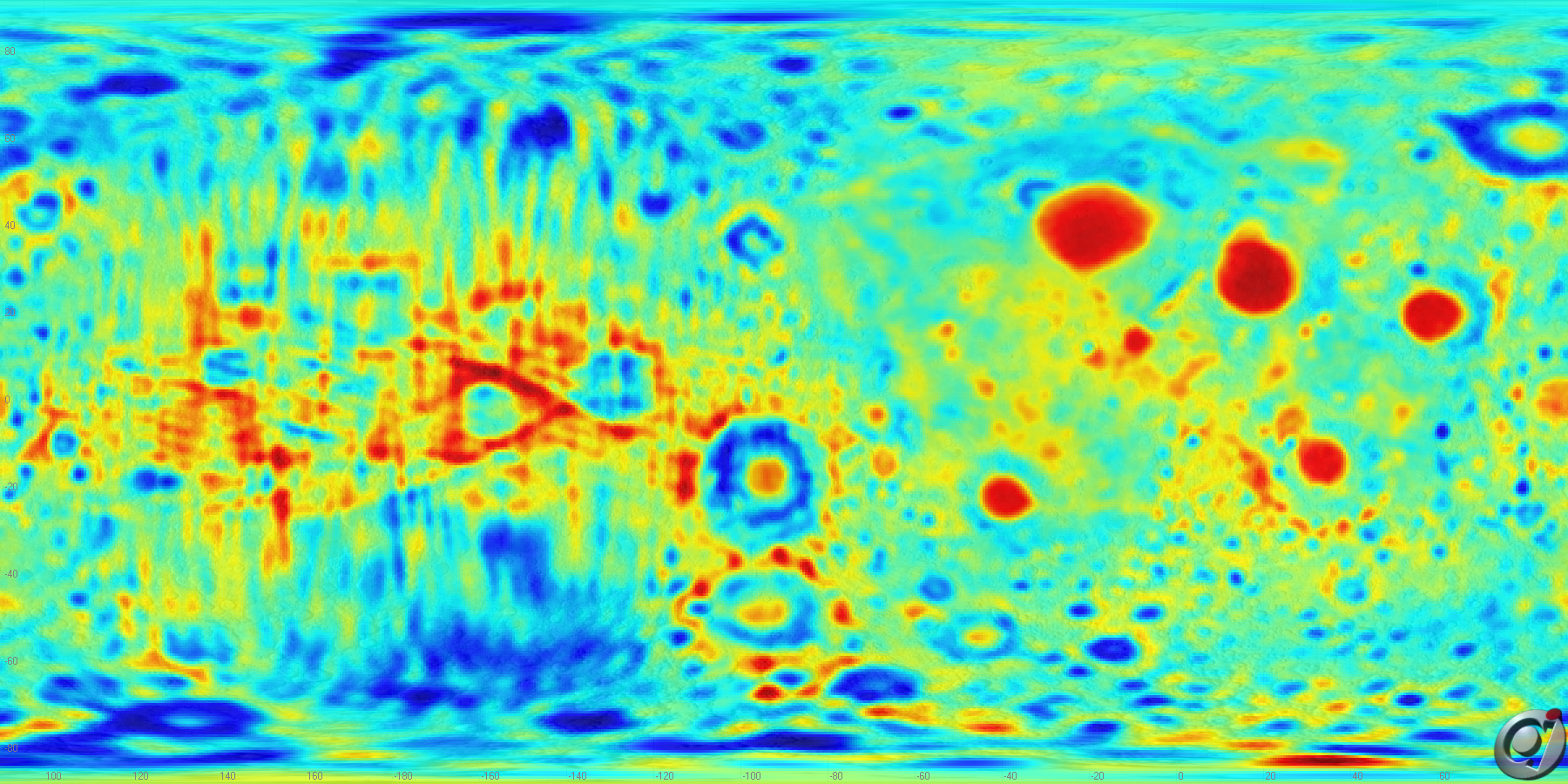
A visualization of the lunar gravity field based on Lunar Prospector data.

In 1998, the United States launched the Lunar Prospector, which hosted the Doppler Gravity Experiment (DGE) -- the first polar, low-altitude mapping of the lunar gravity field. The Prospector DGE obtained data constituted the "first truly operational gravity map of the Moon". The purpose of the Lunar Prospector DGE was to learn about the surface and internal mass distribution of the Moon. This was accomplished by measuring the Doppler shift in the S-band tracking signal as it reaches Earth, which can be converted to spacecraft accelerations. The accelerations can be processed to provide estimates of the lunar gravity field. Estimates of the surface and internal mass distribution give information on the crust, lithosphere, and internal structure of the Moon.

== In popular culture ==
=== Fiction ===
- H.G. Wells, The First Men in The Moon (1901). Wells describes fictional insectoids who live inside a hollow Moon.
- Edgar Rice Burroughs, The Moon Maid (1926). A fantasy story set in the interior of a postulated hollow Moon which had an atmosphere and was inhabited.
- Nikolay Nosov, Dunno on the Moon (1965). A Russian fairytale novel with a hollow Moon.
- Isaac Asimov, Foundation and Earth (1986). Science fiction in which robot R. Daneel Olivaw is depicted living inside a partially hollow Moon.
- David Weber, Mutineers' Moon (1991). Science fiction in which the Moon is a giant spaceship, which arrived 50,000 years ago.
- Moonfall (2022). Science fiction film portraying the Moon as a Dyson sphere enclosing a white dwarf.

=== Conspiracy theory ===
- Don Wilson, Our Mysterious Spaceship Moon (1975) and Secrets of Our Spaceship Moon (1979). Inspired by Vasin-Shcherbakov, Wilson popularized the Spaceship Moon hypothesis.
- George H. Leonard, Somebody Else Is On The Moon (1976). Argues the Moon is inhabited by an Alien race, but NASA has covered up this fact.
- Fred Steckling, We Discovered Alien Bases on the Moon (1981)
- Jim Marrs, Alien Agenda (1997). Long-time JFK conspiracy theorist Marrs embraced the Spaceship Moon conspiracy theory
- Christopher Knight & Alan Butler, Who Built the Moon? (2005). They suggest humans from the future traveled into the past to build the Moon in order to safeguard human evolution.
- David Icke, Human Race Get off Your Knees – The Lion Sleeps No More (2010). Icke suggests that the Moon is in fact a space station from which Reptilians manipulate human thought.
