= Moon theory =

Moon theory may refer to:

- Lunar theory, various theories to account for the Moon's motion
- Hollow Moon, that the Moon is a hollow sphere, including the hypothesis that the Moon is an alien spacecraft
- Moon landing conspiracy theories, various theories that Moon landings were faked
