= Newnham Grange =

Historic building in Cambridge, England

Coordinates: 52°12′03″N 0°06′50″E

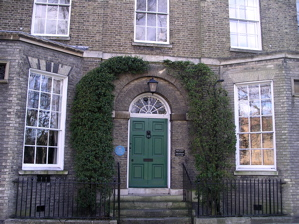
Entrance with blue plaque

Newnham Grange (/ˈnjuːnəm ˈɡreɪndʒ/) is a Grade II listed house on Silver Street, Cambridge, next to the River Cam and The Backs. Since 1962 it has been part of Darwin College, Cambridge.

== History and residents ==
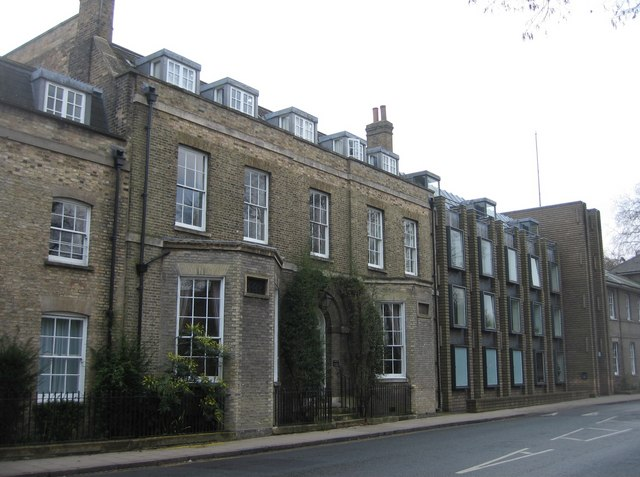
Darwin College

The building was built in 1793 for the family of Patrick Beales, a local corn and coal merchant and twice Mayor of Cambridge. After the death of Beales's daughters, the house was bought by George Darwin and his wife Maud Darwin in 1885 and extensively remodelled. The Darwins had five children:

- Gwendoline Mary Darwin, later Gwen Raverat (1885–1957), artist.
- Charles Galton Darwin (1887–1962), physicist.
- Margaret Elizabeth Darwin (1890–1974), married Sir Geoffrey Keynes.
- William Robert Darwin (1894–1970)
- Leonard Darwin (1899–1899)

Sir George died in 1912, and after the death of his wife, the house subsequently passed to Sir Charles Galton Darwin and his wife Katharine Pember Darwin. They had the following children:

- Cecily Darwin (born 1926) became an X-ray crystallographer and in 1951 married John Littleton of Philadelphia.
- George Pember Darwin (1928–2001) worked developing computers, and then (1964) married Angela Huxley, daughter of David Bruce Huxley. She was also a granddaughter of the writer Leonard Huxley and a great-granddaughter of Thomas Huxley, "Darwin's Bulldog".
- Henry Galton Darwin (1929–1992) was with the British Foreign Office, and married Jane Christie.
- Francis William Darwin (1932–1999) was a zoologist who lectured at King's College in the University of London, and married in 1976.
- Edward Leonard Darwin (born 1934) became a civil engineer.

Lady Maud Darwin died at the house in 1947. After Sir Charles Darwin's death in 1962, the house was donated by the family for the foundation of Darwin College in 1964.

The house is extensively described and illustrated in Gwen Raverat's childhood memoir Period Piece: A Cambridge Childhood, which has a chapter describing the house and flooding from the River Cam.

Lady Margaret Keynes also published a book about the house, House by the River: Newnham Grange to Darwin College

In 2003 a Blue Plaque commemorating Gwen Raverat and Period Piece was unveiled at Newnham Grange by Gwen's daughter Sophie Gurney, with Sophie's son William Pryor and Erasmus Darwin Barlow and his wife Biddy in attendance.
