= Rodolphe Radau =

German astronomer and mathematician

Jean Charles Rodolphe Radau (22 January 1835 – 21 December 1911) was a German astronomer and mathematician who worked in Paris at the Revue des deux Mondes for most of his life. He was the co-founder of the Bulletin Astronomique.

Radau was born in Angerburg, Province of Prussia (now Węgorzewo in Poland), and after studying in Königsberg and working on the Three-body problem, he moved to Paris to collaborate with other scientists. In 1871 he was awarded a Ph.D. in recognition of his work in mathematics.

Radau won the Prix Damoiseau of the French Academy of Sciences in 1892 working on planetary perturbations in the motion of the Moon. This work was of such a high quality that he was elected to the Academy in 1897.

A crater on Mars is named in Radau's honor.

His publications include the Wonders of Acoustics (1867).

== See also ==
- Darwin–Radau equation
