= Darwin–Radau equation =

In astrophysics, the Darwin–Radau equation (named after Rodolphe Radau and Charles Galton Darwin) gives an approximate relation between the moment of inertia factor of a planetary body and its rotational speed and shape. The moment of inertia factor is directly related to the largest principal moment of inertia, C. It is assumed that the rotating body is in hydrostatic equilibrium and is an ellipsoid of revolution. The Darwin–Radau equation states

$$\frac{C}{MR_{e}^{2}} = \frac{2}{3\lambda} = \frac{2}{3} \left( 1 - \frac{2}{5} \sqrt{1 + \eta} \right)$$

where M and R_{e} represent the mass and mean equatorial radius of the body. Here λ is known as d'Alembert's parameter and the Radau parameter η is defined as

$$\eta = \frac{5q}{2\epsilon} - 2$$

where q is the geodynamical constant

$$q = \frac{\omega^{2} R_{e}^{3}}{GM}$$

and ϵ is the geometrical flattening

$$\epsilon = \frac{R_{e} - R_{p}}{R_{e}}$$

where R_{p} is the mean polar radius and R_{e} is the mean equatorial radius.

For Earth, $q \approx 3.461391 \times 10^{-3}$ and $\epsilon \approx 1/298.257$, which yields $\frac{C}{MR_{e}^{2}} \approx 0.3313$, a good approximation to the measured value of 0.3307.
