= Moonfall (film) =

2022 film by Roland Emmerich

- Theatrical release poster
- Directed by: Roland Emmerich
- Written by: Roland Emmerich; Harald Kloser; Spenser Cohen
- Produced by: Roland Emmerich; Harald Kloser
- Starring: Halle Berry; Patrick Wilson; John Bradley; Michael Peña; Charlie Plummer; Kelly Yu; Donald Sutherland
- Cinematography: Robby Baumgartner
- Edited by: Adam Wolfe; Ryan Stevens Harris
- Music by: Thomas Wander; Harald Kloser
- Production companies: Summit Entertainment; UK Moonfall LLP; Centropolis Entertainment; Huayi Brothers; AGC Studios; Tencent Pictures; Street Entertainment
- Distributed by: Lionsgate (United States); China Film Group Corporation (China); Entertainment Film Distributors (United Kingdom)
- Release dates: January 31, 2022 (Los Angeles); February 4, 2022 (United States and United Kingdom); March 25, 2022 (China)
- Running time: 130 minutes
- Countries: United States; Canada; China; United Kingdom
- Language: English
- Budget: $150 million
- Box office: $67.3 million

Moonfall is a 2022 science fiction disaster film co-written, directed, and produced by Roland Emmerich. It stars Halle Berry, Patrick Wilson, John Bradley, Michael Peña, Charlie Plummer, Kelly Yu and Donald Sutherland. It follows two former astronauts alongside a conspiracy theorist who discover the hidden truth about the Moon when it suddenly leaves its orbit.

The film was theatrically released in North America and the UK on February 4, 2022, by Lionsgate and Entertainment Film Distributors respectively. It received mixed reviews from critics, and was a box-office bomb, grossing only $67.3 million worldwide on a $150 million budget, one of the most expensive independently produced films ever made.

== Plot ==
In 2011, astronauts Brian Harper, Jocinda "Jo" Fowler, and Alan Marcus are on a Space Shuttle mission to repair a satellite. A massive swarm of miniature alien technology attacks the orbiter, killing Alan and knocking Jo unconscious before tunneling into the surface of the Moon. Brian, the only witness to the swarm, returns the crippled shuttle to Earth, but his story is dismissed, and he is fired from NASA.

Ten years later, conspiracy theorist KC Houseman, who believes that the Moon is an artificial Dyson sphere, surreptitiously gains access to a research telescope. He discovers that the Moon's orbit is veering closer to Earth. He tries to share his findings with Brian. NASA also discovers the anomaly. When KC anonymously announces his observation on social media, it leads to a global panic. Jo, now NASA's deputy director, launches a spacecraft on an SLS Block 1B+ rocket to investigate the abnormality. After the astronauts drop a probe into a miles-deep artificial shaft that has opened up on the Moon's surface, the alien swarm attacks, killing all three lunar astronauts – seen at NASA via the crew's video feed.

The lunar orbit continues to decay, and as the Moon falls closer and closer to the Earth, seismic and gravitational disturbances occur. Jo meets former NASA official Holdenfield, who reveals that Brian was discredited because of a NASA coverup dating back to Apollo 11. During the first Moon landing, a two-minute radio blackout was meant to conceal evidence of pulsating lights on the surface of the far side of the Moon. Apollo 12 revealed that the Moon is hollow. A military electromagnetic pulse (EMP) device, Zulu X-ray 7, was created to eliminate the swarm, but the project was abandoned for budgetary reasons.

With help from her ex-husband General Doug Davidson, Air Force Chief of Staff, Jo requisitions the EMP and commandeers retired Space Shuttle Endeavour from a museum to serve the new mission: to correct the Moon's orbit and destroy the swarm. Brian, KC, and Jo launch with the EMP, using the Moon's gravity, narrowly escaping to orbit as a tsunami destroys Vandenberg Air Force Base.

They reach the interior of the Moon, confirming KC's theory that it is a Dyson sphere powered by a white dwarf at its center. The Dyson sphere's AI operating system explains to Brian that billions of years ago, the technologically advanced ancestors of modern humans created the AI swarm to serve them, but upon becoming self aware, it went rogue and they were eradicated by it. The ancestors built the Moon as an interstellar ark to create the Earth and then seed life on it, but the AI swarm discovered it and began siphoning energy from its power source, destabilizing its orbit.

Meanwhile, Brian's son Sonny, Jo's son Jimmy, and Jimmy's caregiver/nanny Michelle try to reach Doug's military bunker in the Colorado mountains. They find Brian's ex-wife and Sonny's mother Brenda, her husband Tom, and their family. They avoid disasters caused by the Moon's proximity and fight other hostile survivors, and then reach safety in a mountain tunnel.

As the Moon strips away the local atmosphere, Tom's youngest daughter runs out of oxygen. The injured Tom gives her his own supply; he suffocates to death. The President of the United States orders a nuclear strike on the approaching Moon, but Doug refuses to comply, with debris collapsing the bunker shortly thereafter, apparently killing everyone inside.

As the swarm attacks all electronic objects containing organic life inside, KC lures the swarm away from their spacecraft with their lunar module, sacrificing himself to detonate the EMP. Jo and Brian return to Earth, reuniting with their families, and the Moon's power is restored, returning to its regular orbit, but now shed of its rocky exterior. Reconstructing KC's consciousness, the Moon's operating system appears to KC as his cat Fuzz Aldrin and his mother, who remarks that they must now "get started".

== Cast ==
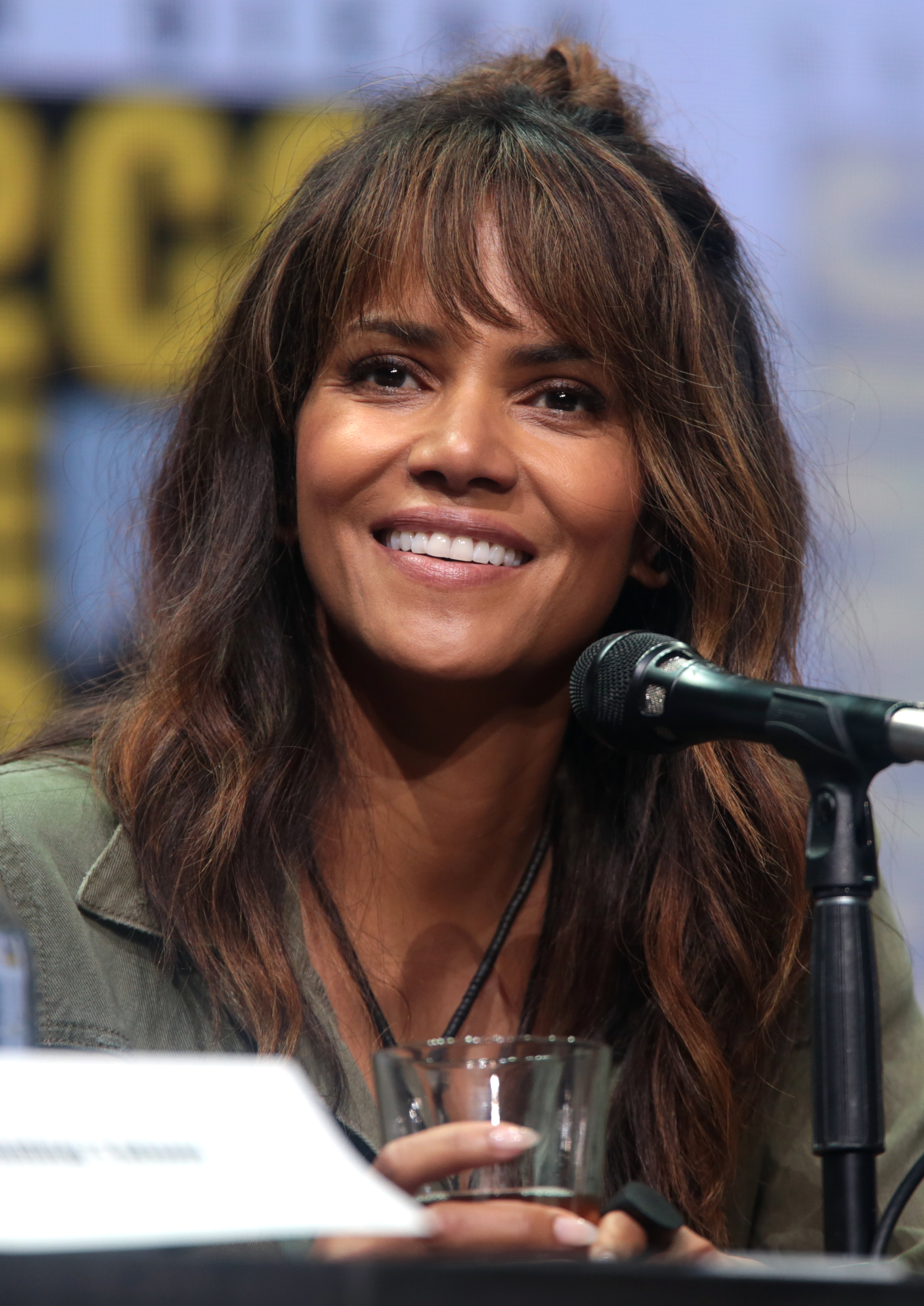
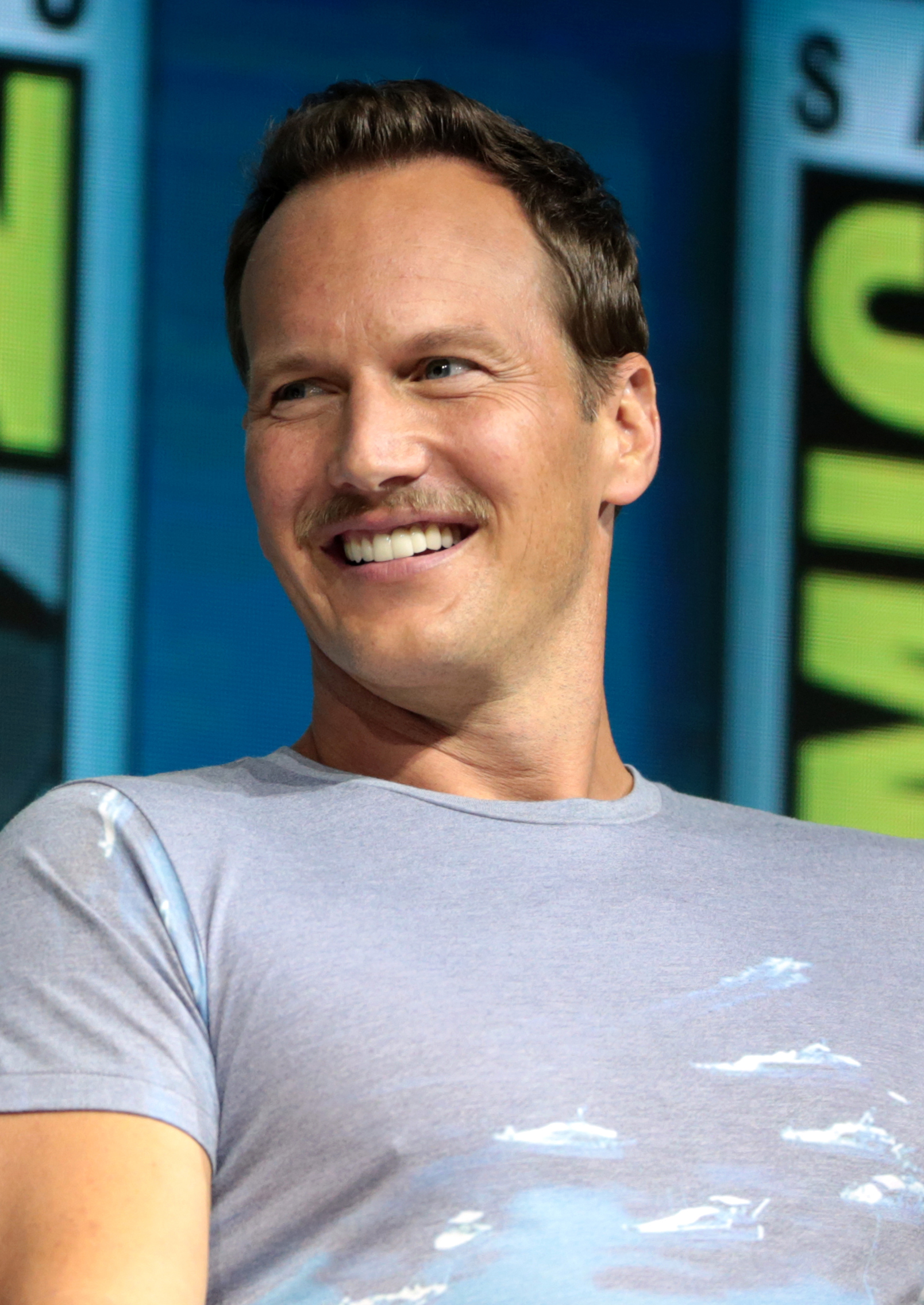
Halle Berry and Patrick Wilson play former NASA astronauts Jocinda Fowler and Brian Harper.
- Halle Berry as Jocinda Fowler, a former NASA astronaut, deputy director of NASA
- Patrick Wilson as Brian Harper, a disgraced former NASA astronaut who flew with Jo
- John Bradley as KC Houseman, a scientist and conspiracy theorist
- Michael Peña as Tom Lopez, Brenda's current husband
- Charlie Plummer as Sonny Harper, Brian and Brenda's estranged son
- Kelly Yu as Michelle, a Chinese foreign exchange student, Jimmy's nanny
- Carolina Bartczak as Brenda Lopez, Brian's ex-wife and Sonny's mother
- Eme Ikwuakor as Doug Davidson, Chief of Staff of the United States Air Force and Jo's ex-husband
- Maxim Roy as Sgt. Gabriella Auclair, task-force leader to retrieve Brian and Houseman
- Zayn Maloney as Jimmy, Jo and Doug's 10-year old son
- Stephen Bogaert as NASA Director Albert Hutchings
- Azriel Dalman as young Sonny
- Ava Weiss as Nikki Lopez, Brenda and Tom's 9-year old daughter
- Hazel Nugent as Lauren Lopez, Brenda and Tom's 12-year old daughter
- Donald Sutherland as Holdenfield, NASA official assigned to conceal the Apollo 11 dark side of the Moon mystery

== Production ==
=== Development ===
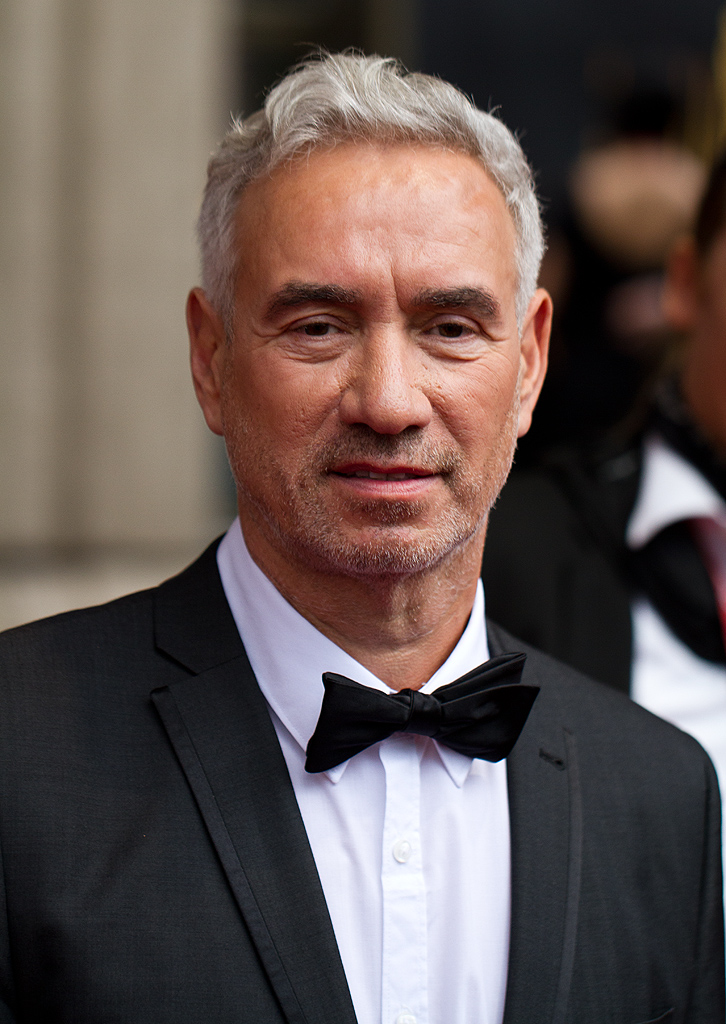
Writer, director, and producer Roland Emmerich

In May 2019, Roland Emmerich was announced to be writing and directing the film. With a $138–146 million budget (including $40 million from Huayi Brothers, $15 million from Lionsgate Films, and $15 million from Germany), it is one of the most expensive independent films ever produced. Emmerich said the project had previously been bought by Universal Pictures, and once he got the rights back, Emmerich and partner Harald Kloser went to the Cannes Film Festival to get financial backers, with the independent nature helping Emmerich get creative control and a 50% share of the film. The idea came after reading Christopher Knight and Alan Butler's book Who Built the Moon?, which discussed the hollow Moon hypothesis, a conspiracy theory about the Moon being an artificial construction, and the script was worked on for four years. In November 2019, Lionsgate and Summit Entertainment acquired the North American distribution rights, and AGC International acquired the international distribution rights.

In May 2020, Josh Gad and Halle Berry were cast, with Patrick Wilson and Charlie Plummer added in June. In October, Stanley Tucci, John Bradley, Donald Sutherland and Eme Ikwuakor were added to the cast, with Bradley replacing Gad due to scheduling conflicts.

=== Filming ===
Filming began in Montreal in October 2020, after previously being planned for a spring start, and lasted for a total of 61 days. Michael Peña, Carolina Bartczak, Maxim Roy and Stephen Bogaert were added in January 2021, with Peña replacing Tucci in his role due to COVID-19 travel restrictions preventing Tucci from traveling to the production. Due to the COVID-19 pandemic, the film had to speed up its principal photography with an additional $5.6 million spent. Among the pandemic's restrictions were a lack of location shooting, forcing the construction of 135 different sets, built primarily on six stages on Grandé Studios. A museum in Florida contributed an original Space Shuttle cockpit, and NASA provided various data regarding the spacecraft.

1,700 visual effects shots were done for Moonfall, primarily handled by four companies, Scanline VFX, Pixomondo, DNEG and Framestore. Scanline was involved as early as a teaser done during the production of Midway for the Cannes pitch, a shot of the Moon coming up behind the Earth that ended up in the finished film.

=== Music ===
For the recording of the score, composer Thomas Wander returned to Synchron Stage Vienna in the autumn of 2021, where Midway's soundtrack had previously been recorded.

The soundtrack album, containing a total of 23 pieces of music, was released as a download by Atlantic Screen Music/Filmtrax on February 4, 2022.

== Release ==
The film held a premiere in Los Angeles on January 31, 2022. It was released theatrically in the United States on February 4, 2022. It was previously scheduled to be released on October 22, 2021. Despite having been advertised in 2021, the film's theatrical release in Canada was canceled because the local distributor, Mongrel Media, found it too risky to go forward with the release and spend the amount of money required on advertising when it was uncertain whether theaters in Ontario and Quebec, which account for a majority of film sales in the country and were shut down due to the pandemic, would be open in time. The film was released in China on March 25, 2022.

Lionsgate spent approximately $35 million in promotions and advertisements, including $12.2 million on TV ads. Social media monitor RelishMix said online reactions were "mixed to negative" while "awareness stats" were below average. The film had a social media reach of 88.9 million interactions (including 51.1 million views on YouTube) from 31 videos shared online, which featured brand deals with Omega SA and Lexus. RelishMix also said "traction ran thin" and that online audiences "questioned the use of the Space Shuttle which has been out of commission since 2011 and chatted about rumors that the movie was heading straight to Netflix", while Emmerich was drawing backlash "for 'hating the Earth'".

=== Home media ===
The film was released for VOD platforms on April 1, 2022, followed by a Blu-ray, DVD, and 4K UHD release on April 26, 2022, by Lionsgate Home Entertainment.

== Reception ==
=== Box office ===
Moonfall grossed $19.1 million in the United States and Canada, and $48.2 million in other territories, for a worldwide total of $67.3 million.

In the United States, Moonfall was released alongside Jackass Forever, and was projected to gross $8–11 million from 3,446 theaters in its opening weekend, with Boxoffice Pro predicting a $9–14 million three-day debut. The film earned $3.4 million on its first day, including an estimated $700,000 from Thursday night previews. Around 300 theaters were closed on Thursday due to a winter storm impacting most of the Midwestern United States. It went on to gross $9.9 million in its opening weekend, finishing second. The film suffered a 70% decline in its second weekend after earning $2.9 million. Moonfall dropped out of the box-office top ten in its third weekend with $1.1 million.

Outside the U.S. and Canada, the film grossed an estimated $9.37 million overseas in its opening weekend. It made $9.7 million in its first weekend in China, debuting at the first position by displacing The Batman. The film was released in the country when a new wave of the COVID-19 pandemic forced more than half of theaters to close. It retained its position during the following weekend with a gross of $3.2 million. In the third weekend it fell to the fourth place while grossing $900,000.

=== Critical response ===
On the review aggregator website Rotten Tomatoes, 35% of 217 critics' reviews are positive. The website's consensus reads: "Whether Moonfall is so bad it's good or simply bad will depend on your tolerance for B-movie cheese – but either way, this is an Emmerich disaster thriller through and through." Metacritic, which uses a weighted average, assigned the film a score of 41 out of 100, based on 45 critics, indicating "mixed or average" reviews. Audiences polled by CinemaScore gave the film an average grade of "C+" on an A+ to F scale, while those at PostTrak gave it a 66% positive score, with 49% saying they would definitely recommend it.

While appearing on The Late Show with Stephen Colbert on October 2, 2023, astrophysicist Neil deGrasse Tyson told Stephen Colbert that Moonfall violated more laws of physics per minute than any other science fiction movie he had ever seen, surpassing what he regarded as the previous record holder, the 1998 film Armageddon. For example, the Space Shuttle Endeavour continues to fire its engines despite the external fuel tank – the source of fuel for the engines – having been jettisoned.
