= Cecily Littleton =

Scottish crystallographer and horticulturalist (1926–2022)

Cecily Darwin Littleton
- Born: 15 November 1926; Edinburgh, Scotland
- Died: 14 April 2022 (aged 95)
- Spouse: John Littleton (died 2009)
- Children: 4
- Parent(s): Charles Galton Darwin; Katharine Pember
- Scientific career
- Institutions: Haverford College; Fox Chase Cancer Center
- Academic advisors: Dorothy Hodgkin

Cecily Darwin Littleton (15 November 1926 – 14 April 2022) was a Scottish X-ray crystallographer and horticulturalist. She worked alongside Dorothy Hodgkin on the identification of the crystal structure of biomolecules.

== Early life and education ==
Littleton was born in Edinburgh. She was the great-granddaughter of Charles Darwin. Her father was Charles Galton Darwin and her mother was a mathematician, Katharine Pember Darwin. Her father worked on atomic theory and X-ray diffraction, and was a member of the Darwin–Wedgwood family. She attended Somerville College, Oxford, where she studied chemistry and graduated in 1949. At Oxford, she worked alongside Dorothy Hodgkin. Together they worked on the structure of biomolecules, including nitrosobenzenes.

== Research and career ==
Littleton moved to Philadelphia and worked alongside Arthur Lindo Patterson at the Fox Chase Cancer Center. She developed the statistical analysis techniques to model crystal structures. She also worked at Haverford College, where she studied stellar evolution.

Like her great-grandfather, Littleton travelled to the Galápagos Islands. In 1989, she donated a chair belonging to Charles Darwin to the Academy of Natural Sciences of Drexel University.

== Selected publications ==
- Littleton, C. D. (10 October 1953). "A structure determination of the gluconate ion". Acta Crystallographica. 6 (10): 775–781. doi:10.1107/s0365110x53002209. ISSN 0365-110X.
- DARWIN, CECILY; HODGKIN, DOROTHY CROWFOOT (November 1950). "Crystal Structure of the Dimer of para-Bromonitrosobenzene". Nature. 166 (4228): 827–828. Bibcode:1950Natur.166..827D. doi:10.1038/166827a0. ISSN 0028-0836. PMID 14780278. S2CID 4222657.

== Personal life ==
Littleton met musician John Littleton, who would later become her husband, at a New Year's Eve party. Together they had four children. He died in 2009. She trained in horticulture in the 1980s. Littleton died on 14 April 2022, of a cardiac arrest.
