= Origin of the Moon =

Theories explaining the formation of Earth's Moon

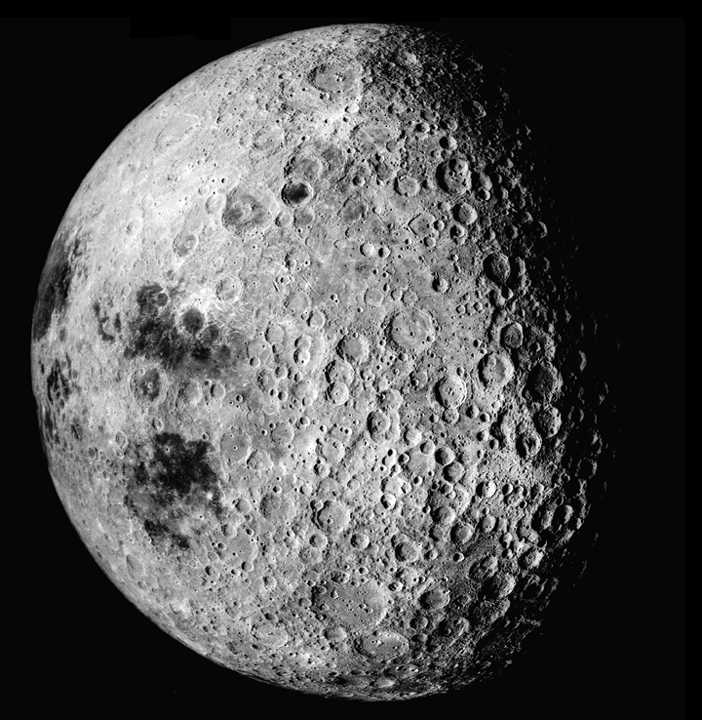
The Moon's heavily cratered far-side

The origin of the Moon is usually explained by a Mars-sized body, known as Theia, striking Earth, creating a debris ring that eventually collected into a single natural satellite, the Moon, but there are a number of variations on this giant-impact hypothesis, as well as alternative explanations, and research continues into how the Moon came to be formed. Other proposed scenarios include captured body, fission, formed together (accretion, synestia), planetesimal collisions (formed from asteroid-like bodies), and collision theories.

The standard giant-impact hypothesis suggests that a Mars-sized body called Theia impacted the proto-Earth, creating a large debris ring around Earth, which then accreted to form the Moon. The Moon's oxygen isotopic ratios seem to be essentially identical to Earth's. Oxygen isotopic ratios, which may be measured very precisely, yield a unique and distinct signature for each Solar System body. If Theia had been a separate protoplanet, it probably would have had a different oxygen isotopic signature than proto-Earth, as would the ejected mixed material. Also, the Moon's titanium isotope ratio (^{50}Ti/^{47}Ti) appears so close to the Earth's (within 4 parts per million) that little if any of the colliding body's mass could have been part of the Moon.

== History ==
Historically, several formation mechanisms have been proposed, but none satisfactorily explains the features of the Earth–Moon system. A fission of the Moon from Earth's crust through centrifugal force would require too great an initial rotation rate of Earth. Gravitational capture of a pre-formed Moon depends on an unfeasibly extended atmosphere of Earth to dissipate the energy of the passing Moon. A co-formation of Earth and the Moon together in the primordial accretion disk does not explain the depletion of metals in the Moon. None of these hypotheses can account for the high angular momentum of the Earth–Moon system.

== Formation ==
"One of the challenges to the longstanding theory of the collision, is that a Mars-sized impacting body, whose composition probably would have differed substantially from that of Earth, probably would have left Earth and the moon with different chemical compositions, which they are not."

— NASA

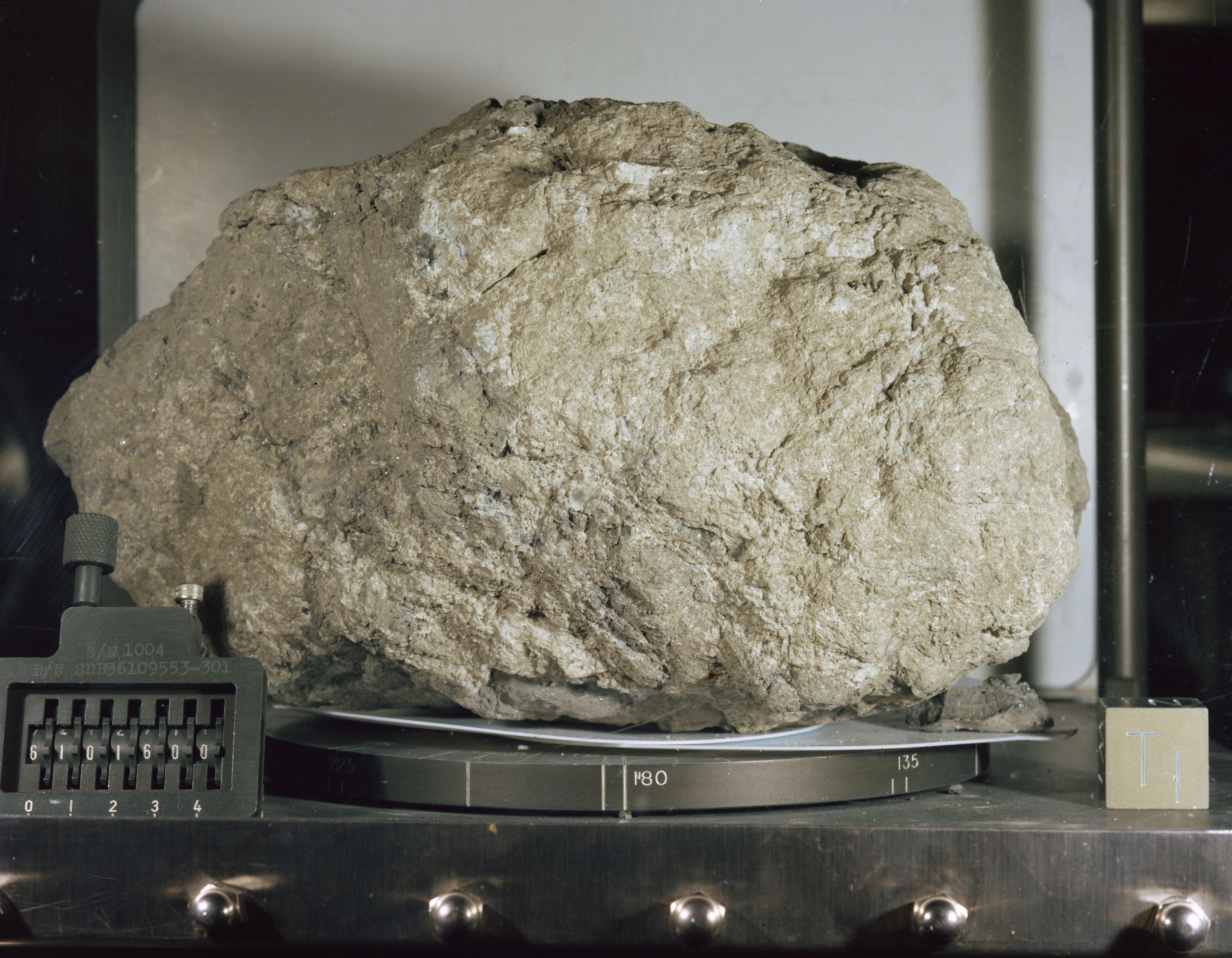
Lunar sample 61016, better known as "Big Muley"

Some theories assume that early in the formation of the Solar System, 4.425 billion years ago, the Earth was largely made of rock and lava, and had no large moons. Theia, an early protoplanet the size of Mars, hit Earth in such a way that it ejected a considerable amount of material away from Earth. Some of this material escaped into space, but the rest consolidated into a single spherical body in orbit about Earth, creating the Moon.

The hypothesis involves a collision between a proto-Earth that was about 90% of the diameter of present Earth, and another body that had half the diameter of the earth and about a tenth of its mass, which would make it about the size of Mars. The latter has sometimes been referred to as Theia, the name of the mother of Selene, the Moon goddess in Greek mythology. This size ratio is needed in order for the resulting system to have sufficient angular momentum to match the current orbital configuration. Such an impact would have put enough material into orbit around Earth to have eventually accumulated to form the Moon.

Computer simulations show a need for a glancing blow, which causes a portion of the collider to form a long arm of material that then shears off. The asymmetrical shape of the Earth following the collision then causes this material to settle into an orbit around the main mass. The energy involved in this collision is impressive: possibly trillions of tonnes of material would have been vaporized and melted. In parts of the Earth, the temperature would have risen to 10,000 °C (18,000 °F).

The Moon's relatively small iron core (compared to other rocky planets and moons in the Solar System) is explained by Theia's core mostly merging into that of Earth. The lack of volatiles in the lunar samples is also explained in part by the energy of the collision. The energy liberated during the reaccretion of material in orbit around Earth would have been sufficient to melt a large portion of the Moon, leading to the generation of a magma ocean.

The newly formed Moon orbited at about one-tenth the distance that it does today, and spiraled outward because of tidal friction transferring angular momentum from the rotations of both bodies to the Moon's orbital motion. Along the way, the Moon's rotation became tidally locked to Earth, so that one side of the Moon continuously faces toward Earth. In this scenario, the Moon would have collided with and incorporated any small preexisting satellites of Earth, which would have shared the Earth's composition, including isotopic abundances. The geology of the Moon has since been more independent of the Earth.

A 2012 study on the depletion of zinc isotopes on the Moon found evidence for volatile depletion consistent with the giant-impact origin for Earth and the Moon. In 2013, a study was released that indicated that water in lunar magma is indistinguishable from that in carbonaceous chondrites and nearly the same as that of Earth in isotopic composition.

== Derivatives of the hypothesis ==
Although the giant-impact hypothesis explains many aspects of the Earth–Moon system, there are still a few unresolved problems, such as the Moon's volatile elements not being as depleted as expected from such an energetic impact.

Another issue is lunar and Earth isotope comparisons. In 2001, the most precise measurement yet of the isotopic signatures of Moon rocks was published. Surprisingly, the Apollo lunar samples carried an isotopic signature identical to Earth rocks, but different from other Solar System bodies. Because most of the material that went into orbit to form the Moon was thought to come from Theia, this observation was unexpected. In 2007, researchers from Caltech showed that the likelihood of Theia having an identical isotopic signature as the Earth is very small (less than 1 percent chance). Published in 2012, an analysis of titanium isotopes in Apollo lunar samples showed that the Moon has the same composition as Earth, which conflicts with the Moon forming far from Earth's orbit.

=== Merger of two planets ===
To help resolve these problems, a hypothesis published in 2012 posits that two bodies—each five times the size of Mars—collided, then recollided, forming a large disc of mixed debris that eventually formed Earth and the Moon.

=== Immediate origin of the Moon as a post-impact satellite ===
Simulation of the formation of the moon caused by a giant impact

The Moon is traditionally thought to have coalesced from the debris ejected by a giant impact onto the early Earth. However, such models struggle to explain the similar isotopic compositions of Earth and lunar rocks at the same time as the system's angular momentum, and the details of potential impact scenarios are hotly debated. Above a high resolution threshold for simulations, a study published in 2022 finds that giant impacts can immediately place a satellite with similar mass and iron content to the Moon into orbit far outside Earth's Roche limit. Even satellites that initially pass within the Roche limit can reliably and predictably survive, by being partially stripped and then torqued onto wider, stable orbits. Furthermore, the outer layers of these directly formed satellites are molten over cooler interiors and are composed of around 60% proto-Earth material. This could alleviate the tension between the Moon's Earth-like isotopic composition and the different signature expected for the impactor. Immediate formation opens up new options for the Moon's early orbit and evolution, including the possibility of a highly tilted orbit to explain the lunar inclination, and offers a simpler, single-stage scenario for the origin of the Moon.

=== Multiple impacts ===
In 2004, Russian astrophysicist Nikolai Gorkavyi proposed a novel model titled the multiple large asteroid impacts model, which found support from a notable group of Russian astronomers in 2013 and later, in 2017, by planetary researchers at Weizmann Institute of Science in Rehovot, Israel. In general terms, the main idea of the model suggests that the Moon was formed as a result of a violent rain of large asteroids (1–100 km) that repeatedly hammered the fledgling Earth over millions of years. Such a series of smaller impacts, which were probably more common in the early Solar System, could blast enough rocky Earth debris into orbit to form a protosatellite disk which later forms into a small moonlet. As repeated impacts created more balls of debris, the moonlets could merge over time into one large moon.

=== Synestia hypothesis ===
In 2018, researchers at Harvard and UC Davis developed computer models demonstrating that one possible outcome of a planetary collision is that it creates a synestia, a mass of vaporized rock and metal which forms a biconcave disc extending beyond the lunar orbit. The synestia will eventually shrink and cool to accrete the satellite and reform the impacted planet.

Moon – Oceanus Procellarum ("Ocean of Storms")

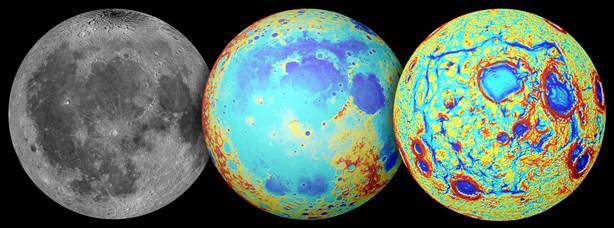
Ancient rift valleys – rectangular structure (visible – topography – GRAIL gravity gradients) (October 1, 2014)

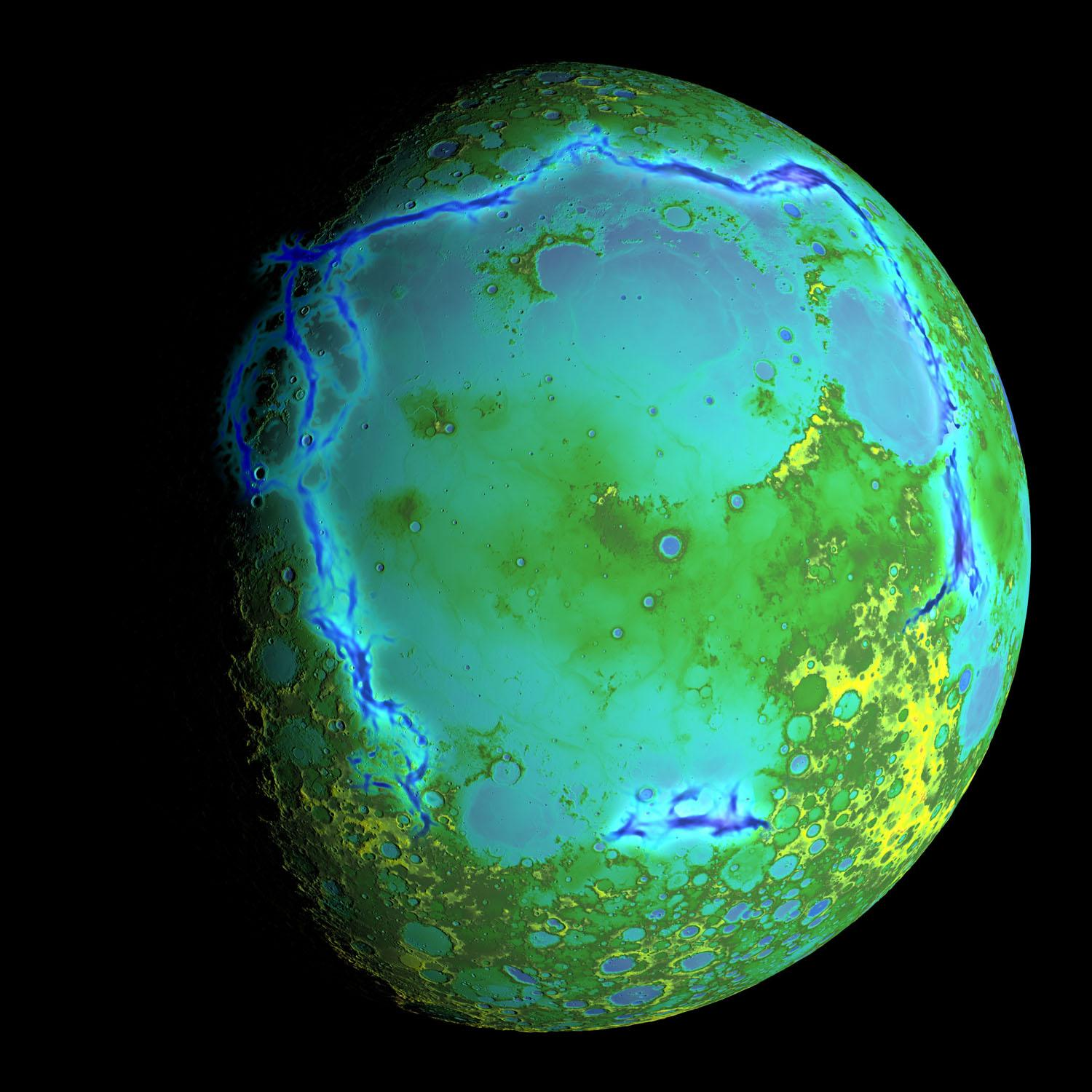
Ancient rift valleys – context

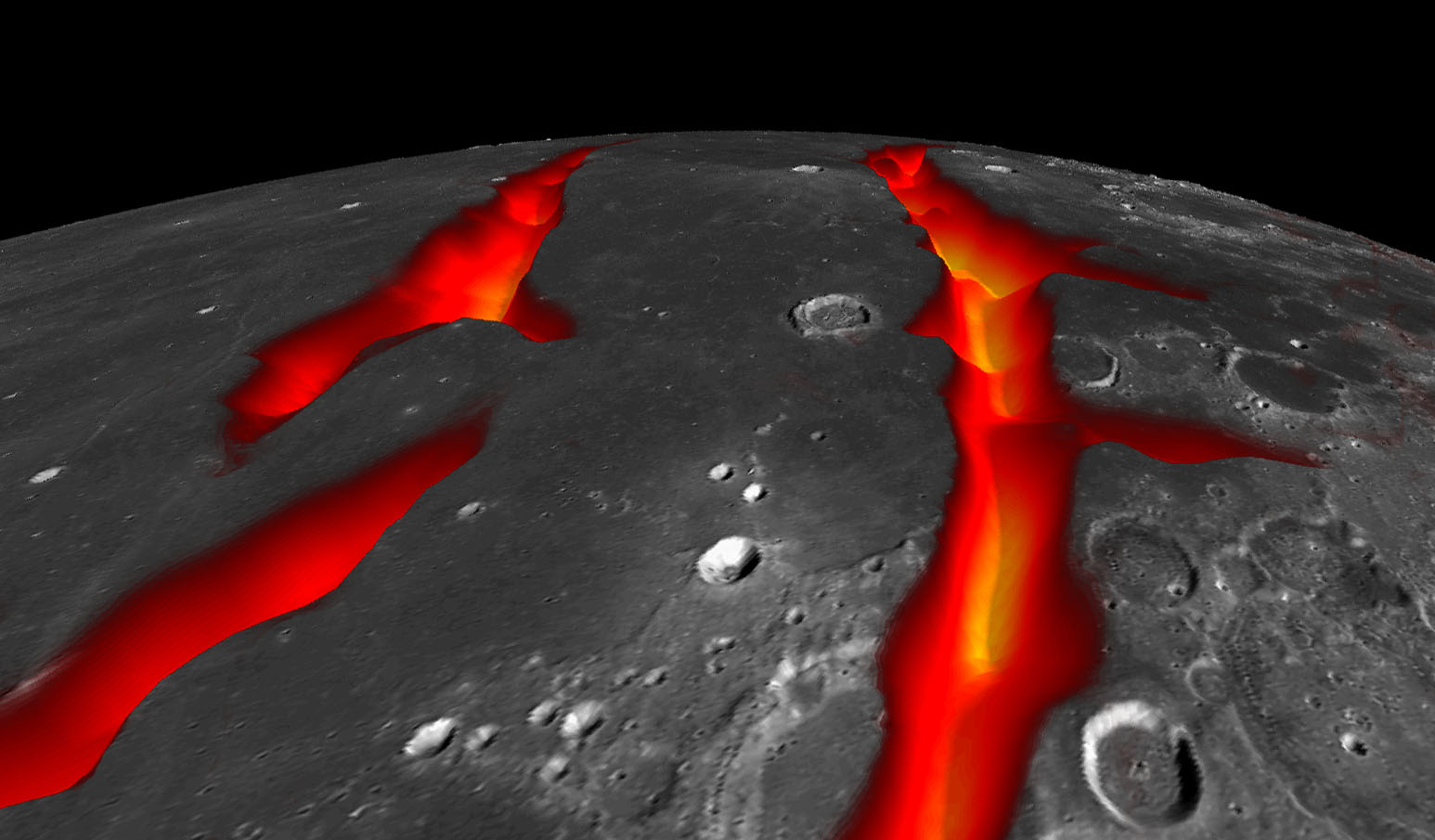
Ancient rift valleys – closeup (artist's concept)

== Other hypotheses ==
Density
Body	Density g/cm^{3}
Mercury	5.4
Venus	5.2
Earth	5.5
Moon	3.3

=== Capture ===
This hypothesis states that the Moon was captured by the Earth. This model was popular until the 1980s, and some points in its favor are the Moon's size, orbit, and tidal locking.

One problem is understanding the capture mechanism. A close encounter of two planetary bodies typically results in either collision or altered trajectories. For this hypothesis to work, there might have been a large atmosphere around the primitive Earth, which would slow the movement of the Moon by aerobraking before it could escape. The hypothesis may also explain the irregular satellite orbits of Jupiter and Saturn. However, this hypothesis does not adequately explain the essentially identical oxygen isotope ratios of the two bodies.

Earth and The Moon to scale, 500 km per pixel

=== Physical fission ===
This is the now discredited hypothesis that an ancient, rapidly spinning Earth expelled a piece of its mass. This was first proposed by George Darwin (son of the famous biologist Charles Darwin) in 1879 and retained some popularity until Apollo. The Austrian geologist Otto Ampferer in 1925 also suggested the emerging of the Moon as cause for continental drift.

It was proposed that the Pacific Ocean represented the scar of this event. Today it is known that the oceanic crust that makes up this ocean basin is relatively young, about 200 million years old or less, whereas the Moon is much older. The Moon does not consist of oceanic crust but of mantle material, which originated inside the proto-Earth in the Precambrian.

==== Via a nuclear fission explosion ====
A more radical alternative hypothesis, published in 1997 by Russian scientist Vladimir Anisichkin: "The Moon could have formed as a result of explosion of the Protoearth" proposes that the Moon may have been formed from the nuclear explosion of actinides located on the solid inner core of the Earth. Dutch scientists Rob de Meijer and Wim van Westrenen suggested in 2010 that the Moon may have formed from a nuclear explosion caused by the centrifugal force of an earlier, spinning proto-Earth. The centrifugal force would have concentrated heavy elements such as thorium and uranium on the equatorial plane and at the boundary between the Earth's outer core and mantle. If the concentrations of these radioactive elements were high enough, this could have led to a nuclear chain reaction that became supercritical, causing a nuclear explosion ejecting the Moon into orbit. This natural nuclear fission reactor has been observed on Earth at a much smaller scale. The fission hypothesis can adequately explain the similarities and differences in the elemental and isotopic compositions of the Earth and the Moon.

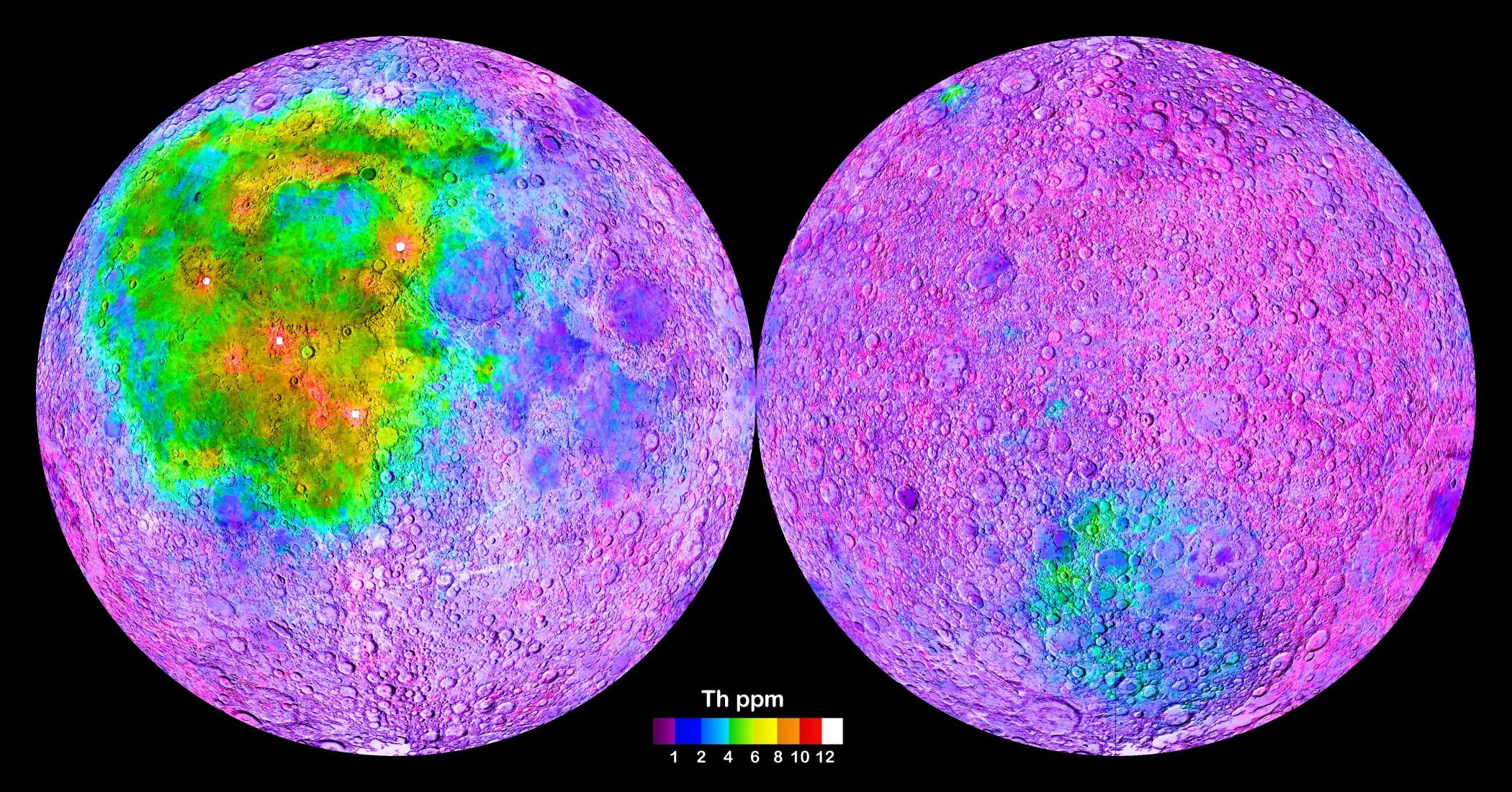
Thorium concentrations on the Moon, as mapped by Lunar Prospector

=== Accretion ===
The hypothesis of accretion suggests that the Earth and the Moon formed together as a double system from the primordial accretion disk of the Solar System or even a black hole. The problem with this hypothesis is that it does not explain the angular momentum of the Earth-Moon system or why the Moon has a relatively small iron core compared to the Earth (25% of its radius compared to 50% for the Earth).

== Additional theories and studies ==
Evolution of the Moon video by NASA around 2012

=== 2011 ===
In 2011, it was theorized that a second moon existed 4.5 billion years ago, and later had an impact with The Moon, as a part of the accretion process in the formation of The Moon.

=== 2013 ===
One hypothesis, presented only as a possibility, was that Earth captured The Moon from Venus.

=== 2017 ===
Uranium–lead dating of Apollo 14 zircon fragments shows the age of the Moon to be around 4.53 billion years.

=== 2020 ===
A team of researchers of the Miniature Radio Frequency (Mini-RF) instrument on NASA's Lunar Reconnaissance Orbiter (LRO) spacecraft concluded that the Moon's subsurface may be richer in metals, like iron and titanium, than scientists had believed.

In July 2020 scientists report that the Moon formed 4.425 ±0.025 bya, about 85 million years later than thought, and that it hosted an ocean of magma for substantially longer than previously thought (for ~200 million years).

=== 2023 ===
On 1 November 2023, scientists reported that, according to computer simulations, remnants of a protoplanet, named Theia, could be inside Earth, left over from a collision with Earth in ancient times, and afterwards becoming The Moon.

== See also ==
- Claimed moons of Earth – Claims that Earth may have other natural satellites
- Far side of the Moon – Hemisphere of the Moon that always faces away from Earth
- Geology of the Moon – Structure and composition of the Moon
- Late Heavy Bombardment – Hypothesized astronomical event
- Lunar Reconnaissance Orbiter – NASA robotic spacecraft orbiting the moon
- Lunar theory – Theoretical description of motion of Earth's moon
- Magma ocean – general description of magma oceans and their formation
- MoonRise – Proposed NASA mission to the Moon

Non-scientific hypotheses

- Hollow Moon
- Phaeton
