= Henry Darwin =

British lawyer and diplomat (1929–1992)

- Born: Henry Galton Darwin; 6 November 1929; Edinburgh, England
- Died: 17 September 1992 (aged 62)
- Occupation: lawyer
- Spouse: Jane Christie (m. 1958)
- Children: 3
- Parent(s): Charles Galton Darwin; Katharine Pember
- Relatives: Darwin–Wedgwood family

Henry Galton Darwin CMG (6 November 1929 – 17 September 1992) was a British lawyer and diplomat specialising in international law.

== Biography ==
Darwin was born in Edinburgh, the second son (of four) and third child (of five) of the physicist Sir Charles Galton Darwin and his wife Katharine Pember, a mathematician. He was a great-grandson of the naturalist Charles Darwin. Educated at Marlborough College and Trinity College, Cambridge, in 1958 he married Jane Christie, an English teacher; they had three daughters:

- Sophia Katherine Darwin (born in Düsseldorf between 1961 and 1963), mathematician
- Emma L. Darwin (born 1964) - novelist
- Carola Frances Darwin (born 1967), opera singer

Darwin was called to the Bar at Lincoln's Inn in 1953. He served as assistant Legal Adviser to the Foreign Office 1954-1960 and again 1963-1967, at which time he was one of the three drafters of the Partial Nuclear Test Ban Treaty, being flown to Moscow in July 1963 to advise Lord Hailsham on the drafting when negotiations were successful; between 1960 and 1963 he was Legal Adviser to the British Embassy in Bonn, West Germany. He was then Legal Counsellor to the UK Mission to the United Nations in Manhattan, New York 1967-1970, before returning to the Foreign and Commonwealth Office (FCO) 1970-1973. He then worked as Director-General Legal Secretariat European Communities Brussels 1973-1976. He was Deputy Legal Adviser to the FCO 1976-1984, during which time in 1977 he was made a Companion of the Order of St Michael and St George. He played a major role in the third United Nations Conference on the Law of the Sea (UNCLOS III), which took place from 1973 through 1982, and was a member of the Preparatory Commission after 1982. He was Second Legal Adviser FCO 1984-1989, when he retired.

Darwin died in London on 17 September 1992. At the time of his death he was leading a group examining legal issues connected with the former Yugoslavia.

== Publications ==
- Darwin, H. G. (1967). "The Outer Space Treaty". 42 Brit. Y.B. Int'l L. 278.
