= Otto Ampferer =

Austrian alpinist and geologist

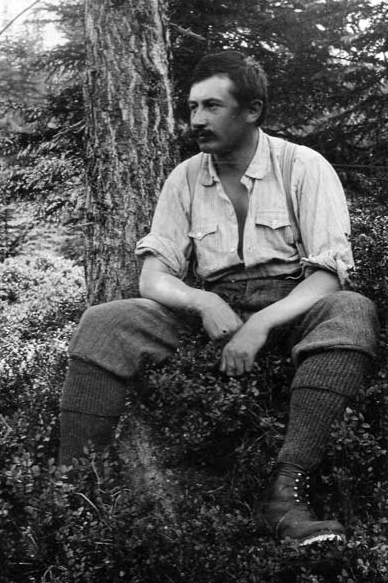
- Otto Ampferer, c. 1900
- Born: 1 December 1875 in Hötting near Innsbruck
- Died: 9 July 1947 (aged 71)

Otto Ampferer (1 December 1875 in Hötting near Innsbruck – 9 July 1947) was an Austrian alpinist and geologist. To explain the complex processes of Orogeny, he developed his "theory of undercurrent" with the idea of a partially plastic deep Earth's crust (asthenosphere). He became – even before Alfred Wegener – the pioneer of the modern view of continental drift.

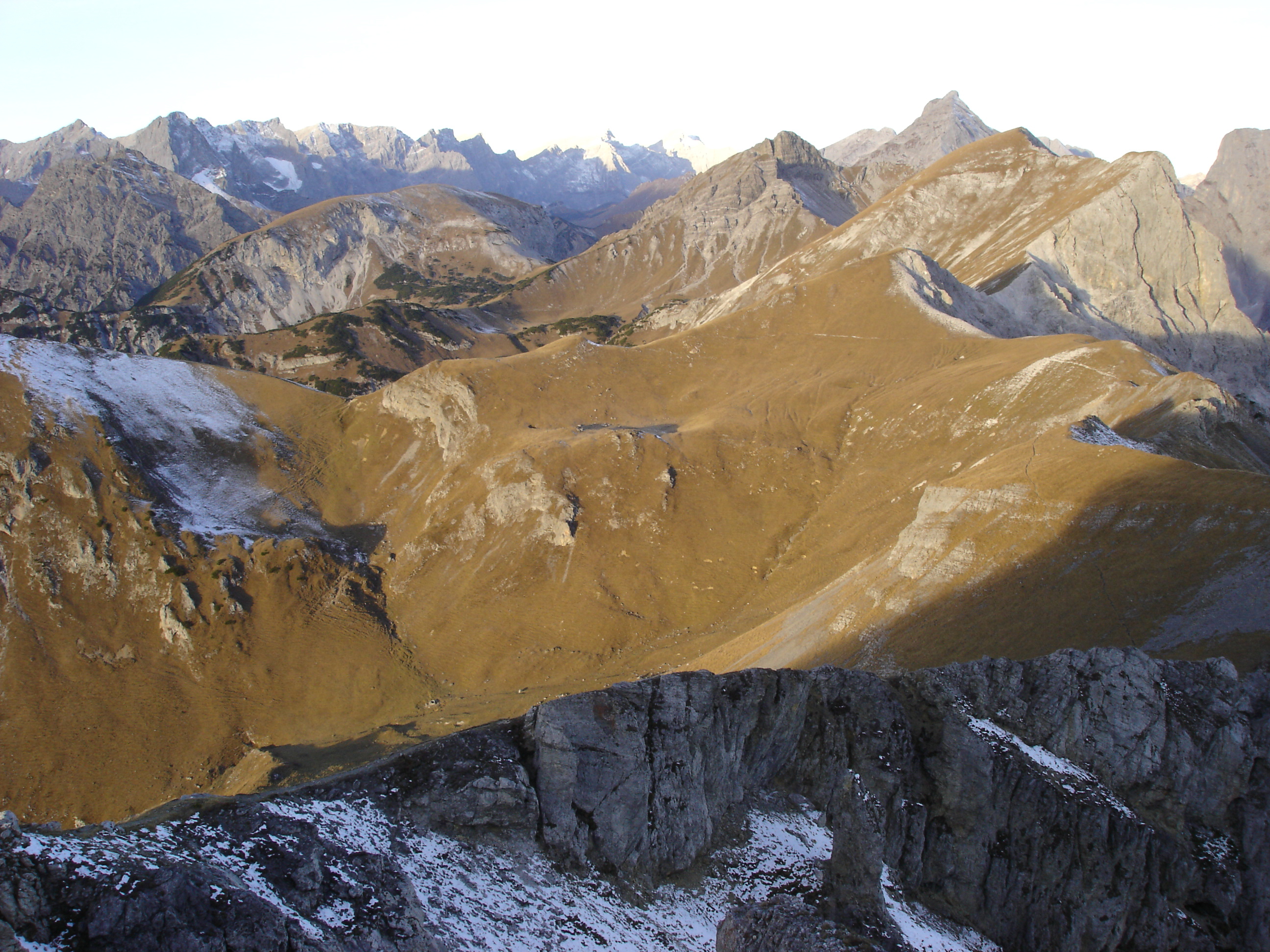
Here, west of the Stanser Joch in Tyrol, Ampferer described the relief shift.

== Life and scientific work ==
Ampferer attended grammar school and then studied physics, mathematics and geology at the University of Innsbruck from 1895, where he obtained his doctorate in 1899. In 1901 he entered the service of the Vienna Geologische Bundesanstalt, which at that time was still Geologische Reichsanstalt. In 1902 he married Olga Sander, the sister of the well-known Innsbruck geologist Bruno Sander. She was his companion on all the walks and she assisted him in many ways. In 1919 he was appointed chief geologist and vice-director of the Federal Institute in 1925. From 1935 to 1937 he was director of this research institute, the Geologische Bundesanstalt, but continued his tectonic, glacial and regional geological work. He produced geological maps and guides in the Gesäusegebirge and Kaisergebirge and dealt with glacial glaciation of the Alps. Altogether he wrote 260 publications and numerous geological map sheets. In 1939 Ampferer was a member of the Reichsstelle für Bodenforschung in Vienna".

Otto Ampferer's name is associated, among other things, with the theory of undercurrent, a hypothesis on the formation of mountain ranges, which later contributed to the development of plate tectonics. His main field of work was the geology of the Alps. In the course of his thorough mapping of the Tyrolean Limestone Alps, he recognised the Karwendel Overthrust as early as 1901, which also played an important role in the assertion of the Overthrust Theory around 1905. In 1906 he wrote an analysis On the motion of the Folded Mountains, wherein he opposed the Contraction Theory of Albert Heim,. Ampferer advocated a theory that is one of the precursors of today's explanatory model of plate tectonics. In his publication On the movement pattern of folded mountains he presented some geotectonic considerations of processes occurring in the deep crust of the Earth and in the upper mantle. For a long time, the tectonic passivity of the mantle was a dogma until Ampferer's undercurrent theory changed this in 1906. Ampferer recognized in these undercurrents the forces that lead to the formation of ocean basins and high mountains on the edges of the drifting continents. In his publication Thoughts on the motion picture of the Atlantic region (1941), he presented a process anticipating what is known today as seafloor spreading. He had also already recognised that there must be subduction zones.

Ampferer considered a detachment of the Moon from the Earth as the cause for the unevenly distributed lithosphere in the time of the primeval continent Pangaea. He faced ridicule and scorn at the time, which, in his own words, put him off further work for years.

In 1928, using the example of the Stanser Joch in Tyrol, he described a relief shift that became exemplary for later work. Furthermore, Ampferer coined the expressions dead folding and mountain rifting.

Ampferer was not only an outstanding geologist, however, he also made a name for himself as a mountaineer. In 1899, for example, together with Karl Berger, he was the first to climb the Campanile Basso in the Brenta Group. Ampferer was also a good draughtsman who did not limit himself to geological motifs.

== Honours ==
In 1937 he received the Eduard Suess Medal for his geoscientific work. In 1939, the German Geological Society awarded him the Gustav Steinmann Medal, with the additional dedication "the thinker in the depths of the mountains". Ampferer was, among other things, elected a member of the German National Academy of Sciences Leopoldina in 1936 and a full member of the Vienna Academy of Sciences in 1940.

In 1956 the Ampferergasse in Vienna-Favoriten (10th district) was named after him. There is also an Ampfererstraße in the Innsbruck district of Höttinger Au, and in Graz the Ampfererweg has been dedicated to him since 1973.

Since 1983, the Austrian Geological Society has awarded the Otto Ampferer Prize every two years to geoscientists (under 35 years of age) for outstanding achievements in the field of geosciences.

In Antarctica, the Ampfererberg was named after him.

== Publications ==
- On the motion pattern of folded mountains. Jahrbuch der k. k. Geologischen Reichsanstalt, Vol. 56, Vienna 1906, pages 539–622.
- Geometric considerations on the construction of the Alps. Mitt. Geol. Ges. Wien, 12, 135–174, Vienna 1920.
- On continental drift. Natural Sciences, 13, 669–675, 8 figs, 1925.
- Value of geology for life. Verh. Geol. B.-A., 1937, 89–98, Vienna 1937.
- On some basic questions of mountain formation. Jb. Geol. B.-A., 87, 375–384, 5 figs, Vienna 1937.
- Fundamentals and statements of geological undercurrent theory. Natur & Volk, 69, 337–349, 9 figs, Frankfurt 1939.
- Against nappism and for the blanket doctrine. Z. Dt. Geol. Ges., 92, 313–332, 7 figs, Berlin 1940.
- Thoughts on the motion picture of the Atlantic region. Sber. österr. Akad. Wiss., math.-naturwiss. KL, 150, 19–35, 6 figs, Vienna 1941.
- Comparison of the tectonic effectiveness of contraction and undercurrent. Mitt. Alpenländ. geol. ver., 35, 107–123, 10 figs, Vienna 1944.
- with W. Hammer: Geological cross-section through the Eastern Alps from the Allgäu to Lake Garda. Jb. Geol. R.-A., 61, 531–710, 50 figs., 3 plates, Vienna 1911.

== Literature ==
- Werner Quenstedt (1953). "Ampferer, Otto". Neue Deutsche Biographie (in German). Vol. 1. Berlin: Duncker & Humblot. pp. 257–259. (full text online).
- "Ampferer Otto". In: Österreichisches Biographisches Lexikon 1815–1950 (ÖBL). Vol. 1, Austrian Academy of Sciences, Vienna 1957, p. 19.
- Manfred Leutner: Science-theoretical case studies on the development of earth science research in Austria: Wilhelm Haidinger - Franz von Hauer - Otto Ampferer. In: Abhandlungen der Geologischen Bundesanstalt, 55 (1999) (digitalisat).
- Karl Krainer/Christoph Hauser: Otto Ampferer (1875-1947): Pioneer in Geology, Mountain Climber, Collector and Draftsman. In: Geo.Alp Special Volume 1 (2007), pp. 91–100.
