= Moment of inertia factor =

Distribution of mass in a celestial body

In planetary sciences, the moment of inertia factor or normalized polar moment of inertia is a dimensionless quantity that characterizes the radial distribution of mass inside a planet or satellite. Since a moment of inertia has dimensions of mass times length squared, the moment of inertia factor is the coefficient that multiplies these.

== Definition ==
For a planetary body with principal moments of inertia A < B < C, the moment of inertia factor is defined as
$$\frac{C}{MR^2}\,,$$
where C is the first principal moment of inertia of the body, M is the mass of the body, and R is the mean radius of the body. For a sphere with uniform density, C/MR^{2} = 2/5 (i.e., 0.4). (Note: For a sphere with uniform density we can calculate the moment of inertia and the mass by integrating over disks from the "south pole" to the "north pole". Using a density of 1, a disk of radius r has a moment of inertia of $$\int_0^r2\pi r^3\ dr=\frac{\pi r^4}2\,,$$ whereas the mass is $$\int_0^r2\pi r\ dr=\pi r^2\,.$$ Letting r = R cos θ and integrating over R sin θ we get: $$\begin{align} \frac C{R^5} &=\frac\pi 2\int_{-1}^1\cos^4\theta\ d\sin\theta\\ & = \frac\pi 2\int_{-1}^1(1-\sin^2\theta)^2\ d\sin\theta\\ & = \frac\pi 2\int_{-1}^1(1-2\sin^2\theta+\sin^4\theta)d\sin\theta\\ & = \frac\pi 2\int_{-1}^1(d\sin\theta-\frac 23d\sin^3\theta+\frac 15d\sin^5\theta)\\ & = \frac 8{15}\pi \\ \frac M{R^3} &=\pi\int_{-1}^1\cos^2\theta\ d\sin\theta\\ & = \pi\int_{-1}^1(1-\sin^2\theta)d\sin\theta\\ & = \pi\int_{-1}^1(d\sin\theta-\frac 13d\sin^3\theta)\\ & = \frac 43\pi \end{align}$$ This gives C/MR^{2} = 2/5.) (Note: For several other examples (in which the rotation axis is the axis of symmetry if not otherwise specified), a solid cone has a factor of 3/10; a uniform thin rod (rotating about its center perpendicularly to its axis, so R is one-half the length of the rod) has a factor of 1/3; a hollow cone or a solid cylinder has a factor of 1/2; a hollow sphere has factor of 2/3; a hollow open-ended cylinder has a factor of 1.) For a differentiated planet or satellite, where there is an increase of density with depth, C/MR^{2} < 0.4. The quantity is a useful indicator of the presence and extent of a planetary core, because a greater departure from the uniform-density value of 0.4 conveys a greater degree of concentration of dense materials towards the center.

== Solar System values ==
The Sun has by far the lowest moment of inertia factor value among Solar System bodies; it has by far the highest central density (162 g/cm^{3}, (Note: A star's central density tends to increase over the course of its lifetime, aside from during brief core nuclear fusion ignition events like the helium flash.) compared to ~13 g/cm^{3} for Earth) and a relatively low average density (1.41 g/cm^{3}, versus Earth's average density of 5.5 g/cm^{3}). Saturn has the lowest value among the gas giants in part because it has the lowest bulk density (0.687 g/cm^{3}). Ganymede has the lowest moment of inertia factor among solid bodies in the Solar System because of its fully differentiated interior, a result in part of tidal heating due to the Laplace resonance, as well as its substantial component of low density water ice. Callisto is similar in size and bulk composition to Ganymede, but is not part of the orbital resonance and is less differentiated. The Moon is thought to have a small core, but its interior is otherwise relatively homogenous.

List of moment of inertia factors (C/MR^{2}) of selected Solar system bodies
Body	Value	Notes	Source
Sun	0.070	Not measured	
Mercury	0.346±0.014		
Venus	0.337±0.024		
Earth	0.3307		
Moon	0.3929±0.0009		
Mars	0.3644±0.0005		
Ceres	0.36±0.15 (Note: The value given for Ceres is the mean moment of inertia, which is thought to better represent its interior structure than the polar moment of inertia, due to its high polar flattening.)	Not measured (range reflects different assumptions for original spin rate)	
Jupiter	0.2756±0.0006	Not measured (two-layer model calculations constrained by Juno gravity data)	
Io	0.37824±0.00022	Not measured (Darwin-Radau relation)	
Europa	0.346±0.005	Not measured (Darwin-Radau relation)	
Ganymede	0.3115±0.0028	Not measured (Darwin-Radau relation)	
Callisto	0.3549±0.0042	Not measured (Darwin-Radau relation)	
Saturn	0.22	Not measured (Darwin-Radau relation)	
Enceladus	0.3305±0.0025	Not measured (Darwin-Radau relation)	
Rhea	0.3911±0.0045	Not measured (Darwin-Radau relation)	
Titan	0.341	Not measured (Darwin-Radau relation)	
Uranus	0.23	Not measured (approximate solution to Clairaut's equation)	
Neptune	0.23	Not measured (approximate solution to Clairaut's equation)	

== Measurement ==
The polar moment of inertia is traditionally determined by combining measurements of spin quantities (spin precession rate and/or obliquity) with gravity quantities (coefficients of a spherical harmonic representation of the gravity field). These geodetic data usually require an orbiting spacecraft to collect.

== Approximation ==
For bodies in hydrostatic equilibrium, the Darwin–Radau relation can provide estimates of the moment of inertia factor on the basis of shape, spin, and gravity quantities.

== Role in interior models ==
The moment of inertia factor provides an important constraint for models representing the interior structure of a planet or satellite. At a minimum, acceptable models of the density profile must match the volumetric mass density and moment of inertia factor of the body.

== Gallery of internal structure models ==
The Sun (C/MR^{2} = 0.070)

Saturn (C/MR^{2} = 0.22)

Ganymede (C/MR^{2} = 0.3115)

Earth (C/MR^{2} = 0.3307)

Callisto (C/MR^{2} = 0.3549)

The Moon (C/MR^{2} = 0.3929)
