= Charles Galton Darwin =

British physicist (1887–1962)

Sir Charles Galton Darwin KBE MC FRS
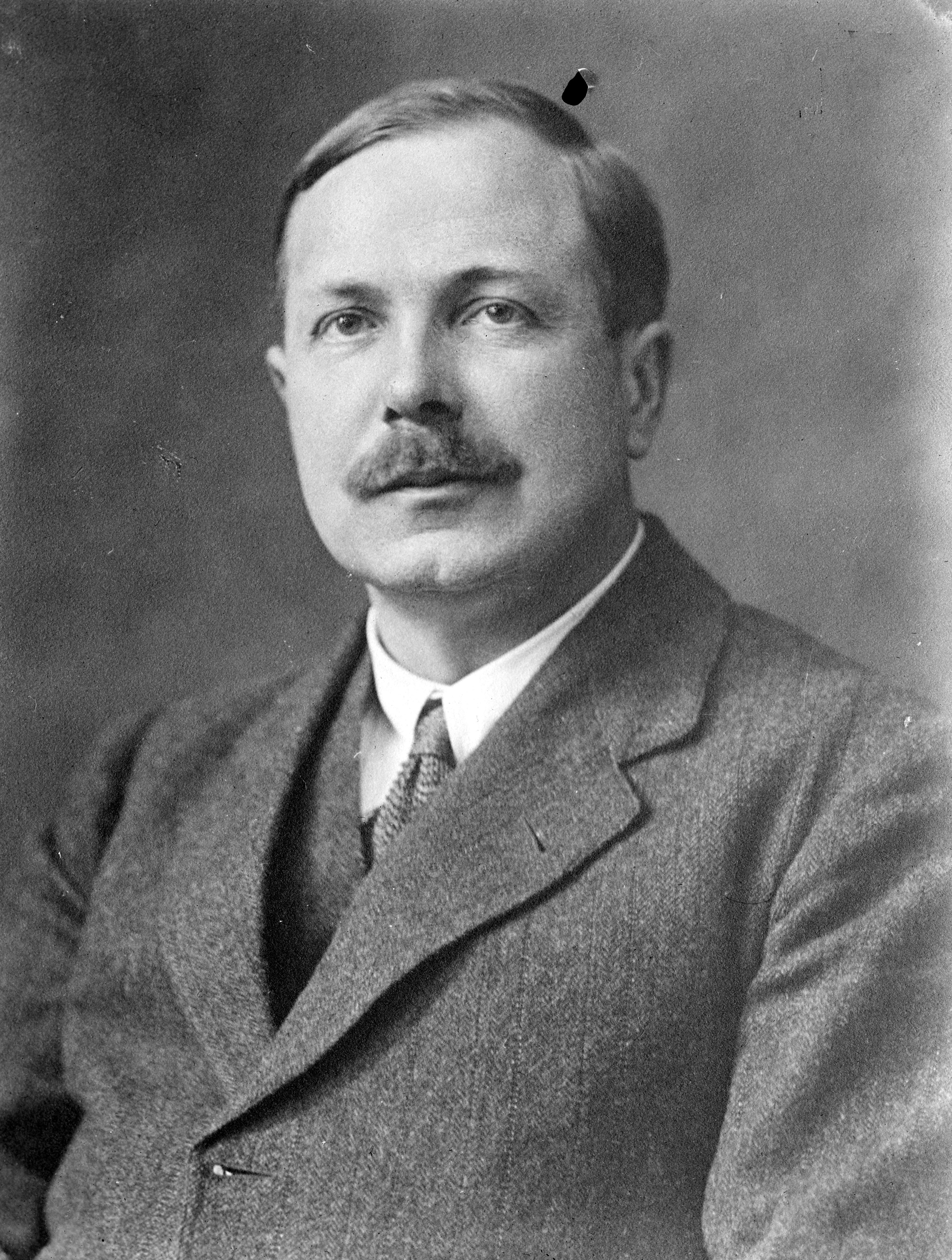
- Born: Charles Galton Darwin; 19 December 1887; Cambridge, England
- Died: 31 December 1962 (aged 75); Cambridge, England
- Education: Trinity College, Cambridge
- Known for: Darwin term Darwin Lagrangian; Darwin drift Darwin–Radau equation Darwin–Fowler method
- Spouse: Katharine Pember (m. 1925)
- Children: 5, including Cecily and Henry
- Parent(s): George Howard Darwin; Martha (Maud) du Puy
- Relatives: Darwin–Wedgwood family
- Awards: Royal Medal (1935); Fellow of the Royal Society
- Scientific career
- Fields: Physicist
- Workplaces: National Physical Laboratory; Victoria University of Manchester; Royal Engineers; Christ's College, Cambridge; California Institute of Technology; University of Edinburgh; Manhattan Project
- Academic advisors: Ernest Rutherford; Niels Bohr

4th Director of NPL
- In office 1949–1938
- Preceded by: William Lawrence Bragg
- Succeeded by: Edward Victor Appleton (Acting)

Sir Charles Galton Darwin KBE MC FRS (19 December 1887 – 31 December 1962) was an English physicist who served as director of the National Physical Laboratory (NPL) during the Second World War. He was a son of the mathematician George Darwin and a grandson of Charles Darwin.

== Early life ==
Darwin was born at Newnham Grange in Cambridge, England into a scientific dynasty. He was a son of mathematician Sir George Darwin and a grandson of Charles Darwin. His mother was Lady Darwin, Maud du Puy of Philadelphia, Pennsylvania. Darwin's elder sister was the artist Gwen Raverat, and his younger sister Margaret married Geoffrey Keynes, the brother of the economist John Maynard Keynes. His younger brother William Robert Darwin was a London stockbroker. Darwin was educated at Marlborough College (1901–1906) and then studied mathematics at Trinity College, Cambridge, graduating BA in 1910, later promoted to MA by seniority.

== Career ==
Darwin secured a post-graduate position at the Victoria University of Manchester, working under Ernest Rutherford and Niels Bohr on Rutherford's atomic theory.

On 4 April 1911, he was elected to the membership of Manchester Literary and Philosophical Society while a Reader in Mathematical Physics.

In 1912, his interests developed into using his mathematical skills assisting Henry Moseley on X-ray diffraction. His two 1914 papers on the dynamical theory of diffraction of X-rays from perfect crystals became often cited classics, minting the Darwin Curve of reflectivity. In a further paper of 1922, he introduced the mosaic crystal model.

On the outbreak of World War I, he was commissioned and sent to France as a censor. A year later William Lawrence Bragg had him transferred to the Royal Engineers to participate in the work on the localisation of enemy artillery by sound ranging. When that research was on a solid footing, he was transferred to the Royal Air Force to study aircraft noise. He was awarded the Military Cross in 1918.

From 1919 to 1922, he was a lecturer and fellow of Christ's College, Cambridge, where he worked with R.H. Fowler on statistical mechanics and what came to be known as the Darwin–Fowler method. He then worked for a year at the California Institute of Technology before becoming the first Tait Professor of Natural Philosophy at the University of Edinburgh in 1924, working on quantum optics and magneto-optic effects. He was the first to calculate the fine structure of the hydrogen atom under Paul Dirac's relativistic theory of the electron, in 1928. He was assisted at the university by Dr Robert Schlapp.

In 1936, Darwin asked fellow physicist Max Born if he would consider becoming his successor as Tait Professor, an offer that Born promptly accepted. He then resigned his post in Edinburgh to become Master of Christ's College, beginning his career as an active and able administrator, becoming director of the National Physical Laboratory on the approach of war in 1938. He served in the role into the post-war period, unafraid to seek improved laboratory performance through re-organisation, but spending much of the war years working on the Manhattan Project co-ordinating the American, British, and Canadian efforts.

Darwin was appointed KBE in 1942. In 1952, he was elected to the American Philosophical Society.

== Private life ==
In 1925, Darwin married Katharine Pember, a mathematician and daughter of Francis William Pember. They had four sons and a daughter:

- Cecily Darwin (1926–2022) became an X-ray crystallographer and in 1951 married John Littleton of Philadelphia.
- George Pember Darwin (1928–2001) worked developing computers, and then (1964) married Angela Huxley, daughter of David Bruce Huxley. She was also a granddaughter of the writer Leonard Huxley and a great-granddaughter of Thomas Huxley, "Darwin's Bulldog".
- Henry Galton Darwin (1929–1992) was with the British Foreign Office, and married Jane Christie.
- Francis William Darwin (1932–1999) was a zoologist and taught at the University of London, and married in 1976.
- Edward Leonard Darwin (1934–2020) became a civil engineer.

In his spare time, Darwin also served as a wartime vice-president of the Simplified Spelling Society.

On his retirement, his attention turned to issues of population, genetics, and eugenics. His conclusions were pessimistic and entailed a resigned belief in an inevitable Malthusian catastrophe, as described in his 1952 book The Next Million Years. He first argued in this book that voluntary birth control (family planning) establishes a selective system that ensures its own failure. The cause is that people with the strongest instinct for wanting children will have the largest families and they will hand on the instinct to their children, while those with weaker instincts will have smaller families and will hand on that instinct to their children. In the long run society will consist mainly of people with the strongest instinct to reproduce. This would ultimately have dysgenic effects.

He died at Newnham Grange in Cambridge (the house where he was born) on New Year's Eve 1962/3; he was cremated at Cambridge Crematorium on 4 January 1963. He and his late wife are commemorated with a memorial at St Botolph's Church, Cambridge; she was cremated, the funeral was in Wimbledon, where she had been living.

== Publications ==
- The New Conceptions of Matter (1931)
- The Next Million Years (1952)

Academic offices
Preceded by Norman McLean	Master of Christ's College, Cambridge; 1936–1939	Succeeded by Charles Earle Raven
Government offices
Preceded by William Lawrence Bragg	Managing Director of the National Physical Laboratory; 1938–1949	Succeeded by Edward Bullard
