= George Darwin =

English barrister and astronomer (1845–1912)

Sir George Darwin KCB FRS FRSE
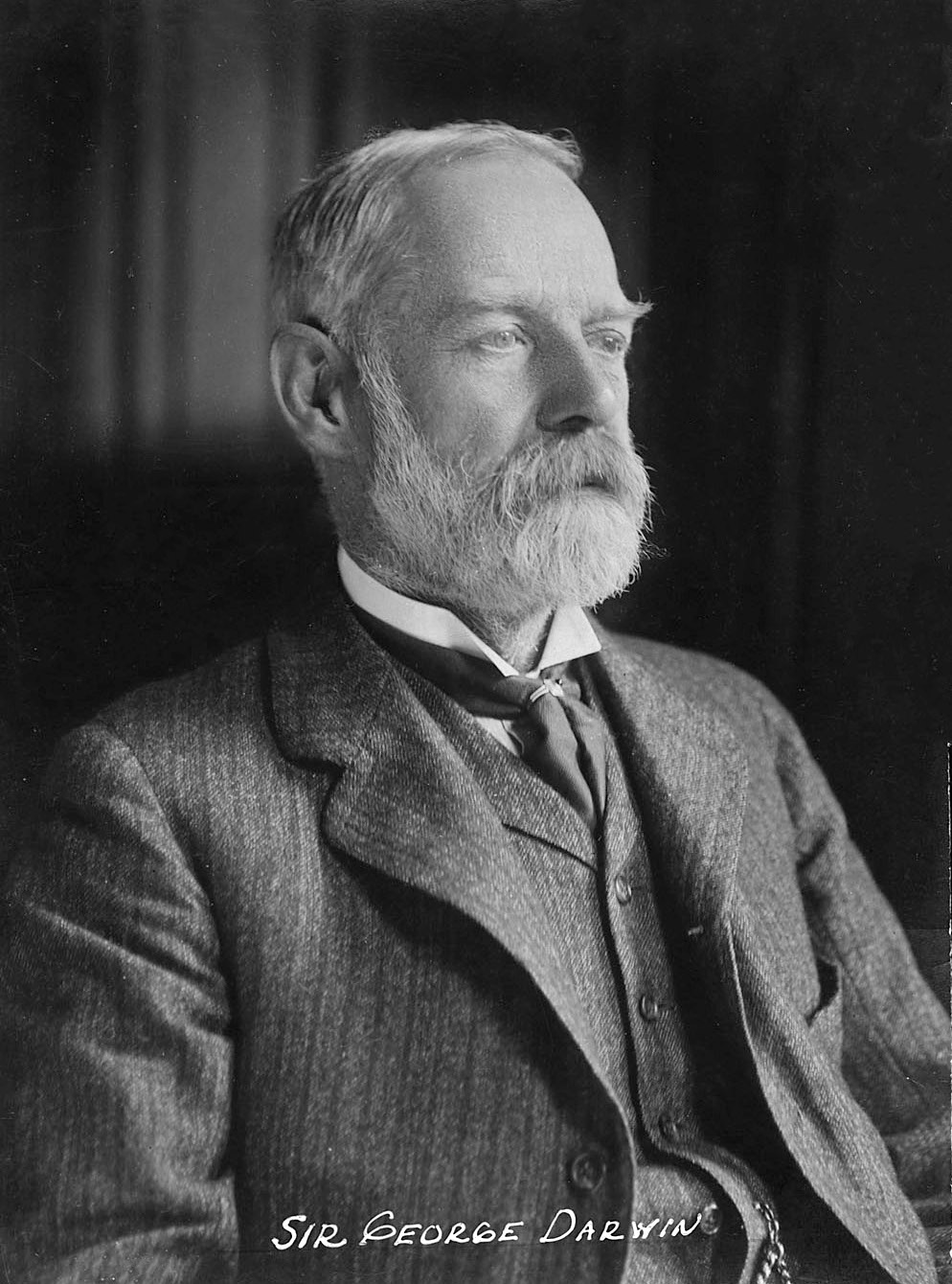
- Sir George Howard Darwin
- Born: George Howard Darwin; 9 July 1845; Down House, Downe, Kent, England
- Died: 7 December 1912 (aged 67); Cambridge, England
- Education: St John's College, Cambridge; Trinity College, Cambridge
- Known for: Darwin symbols
- Spouse: Martha (Maud) du Puy (m. 1884)
- Children: 5, including Gwen and Charles Galton
- Parent(s): Charles Darwin; Emma Wedgwood
- Awards: Smith's Prize (1868); The William Hopkins Prize (1879); Royal Medal (1884); Gold Medal of the Royal Astronomical Society (1892); Copley Medal (1911)
- Scientific career
- Fields: Astronomy and mathematics
- Academic advisors: Edward John Routh
- Notable students: Ernest William Brown; E. T. Whittaker

Signature
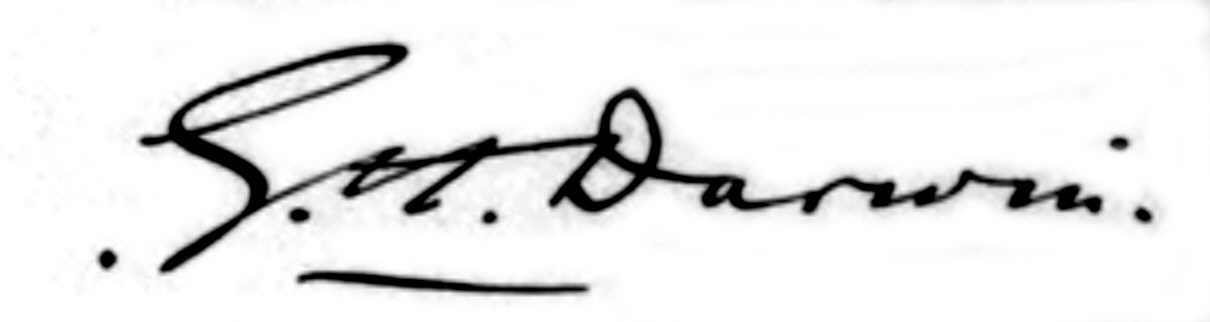

Sir George Howard Darwin (9 July 1845 – 7 December 1912) was an English barrister and astronomer, the second son and fifth child of Charles Darwin and Emma Darwin. He is known for the harmonic analysis of the theory of tides as well as the discredited fission theory of the origin of the Moon. The Darwin symbols for tides are named after him.

== Biography ==
George H. Darwin was born 9 July 1845 at Down House, Kent, the fifth child of biologist Charles Darwin and Emma Darwin.

From the age of 11 he studied under Charles Pritchard at Clapham Grammar School, and entered St John's College, Cambridge, in 1863, though he soon moved to Trinity College, where his tutor was Edward John Routh. He graduated BA in mathematics in 1868 (as second wrangler), when he was also placed second for the Smith's Prize and was appointed to a college fellowship. He became M.A. in 1871. He was admitted to the bar in 1872, but returned to science. George Darwin conducted studies into the prevalence and health outcomes of contemporary first-cousin marriages (such as his parents') in Great Britain. His father Charles had become concerned after the death of three of his children, including his favourite daughter, Annie, from tuberculosis in 1851, that his and Emma's union may have been a mistake from a biological perspective. He was reassured by George's results.

== Tides and geophysics ==
Although George Darwin was the son of the famous geologist turned biologist, Charles Darwin, rather than moving predominantly into the field of biology, George kept his focus on geology. Subsequently, his efforts within geology caused him to stumble onto many seemingly radical ideas, some of which were related to the notion that preserved within the physical structure of the planet was the mechanical energy (or the collective inertial motion), which may have allowed an ancient rapidly spinning Earth to somehow expel a piece of its mass, and it was this expelled mass which later congealed to create the natural satellite that was now in orbit around the Earth. So, before the Apollo mission and the rise to prominence of the relativistic notion that the origin of the Moon was due in part to collisions within a very active protoplanetary disk, there was a radically different depiction of lunar and planetary evolution, which was proposed by George Darwin, in 1879, called the fission theory.

In 1883 Darwin became Plumian Professor of Astronomy and Experimental Philosophy at the University of Cambridge. He studied tidal forces involving the Sun, Moon, and Earth, and formulated the fission theory of the Moon formation. In 1885, he collaborated with Andrew Wilson Baird to produce a definitive "Report on the Harmonic Analysis of Tidal Observations" for the British Association, a work that utilised Baird's extensive field data from the Survey of India to refine the mathematical reduction of tidal components.

He was an invited speaker in the International Congress of Mathematicians 1908, Rome on the topic of "Mechanics, Physical Mathematics, Astronomy." As President of the Cambridge Philosophical Society, he also gave the Introductory Address to the Congress in 1912 on the character of pure and applied mathematics.

== Honors and awards ==
In 1879, he was elected a Fellow of the Royal Society and won their Royal Medal in 1884 and their Copley Medal in 1911. He delivered their Bakerian Lecture in 1891 on the subject of "tidal prediction".

Darwin was a Fellow of the Royal Astronomical Society (RAS) and won the Gold Medal of the RAS in 1892. He was elected to both the American Academy of Arts and Sciences and the American Philosophical Society in 1898. From 1899–1901 he served as President of the RAS. He was elected to the United States National Academy of Sciences in 1904. The RAS founded a prize lectureship in 1984 and named it the George Darwin Lectureship in Darwin's honour.

He received the degree of Doctor mathematicae (honoris causa) from the Royal Frederick University in Oslo on 6 September 1902, when they celebrated the centennial of the birth of mathematician Niels Henrik Abel.

Darwin crater on Mars is named after him.

== Family ==
Darwin married Martha (Maud) du Puy, the daughter of Charles du Puy of Philadelphia, in 1884; his wife was a member of the Ladies Dining Society in Cambridge, with 11 other members.

She died on 6 February 1947. They had three sons and two daughters:

- Gwen Raverat (1885–1957), artist.
- Sir Charles Galton Darwin (1887–1962), physicist and applied mathematician.
- Margaret Elizabeth Darwin (1890–1974), married Sir Geoffrey Keynes.
- William Robert Darwin (1894–1970)
- Leonard Darwin (1899–1899)

George and Maud Darwin bought Newnham Grange, Cambridge in 1885. The Darwins extensively remodelled the house. Since 1962 the Grange has been part of Darwin College, Cambridge.

He is buried in Trumpington Extension Cemetery in Cambridge with his son Leonard and his daughter Gwen (Raverat), whilst his wife, Maud, was cremated at Cambridge Crematorium; his brothers Sir Francis Darwin and Sir Horace Darwin and their respective wives are interred in the Parish of the Ascension Burial Ground.

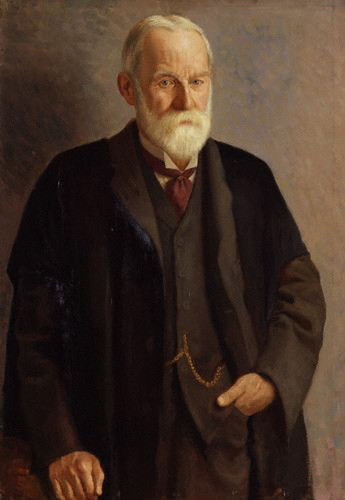
Sir George Howard Darwin, oil on canvas, Mark Gertler, 1912

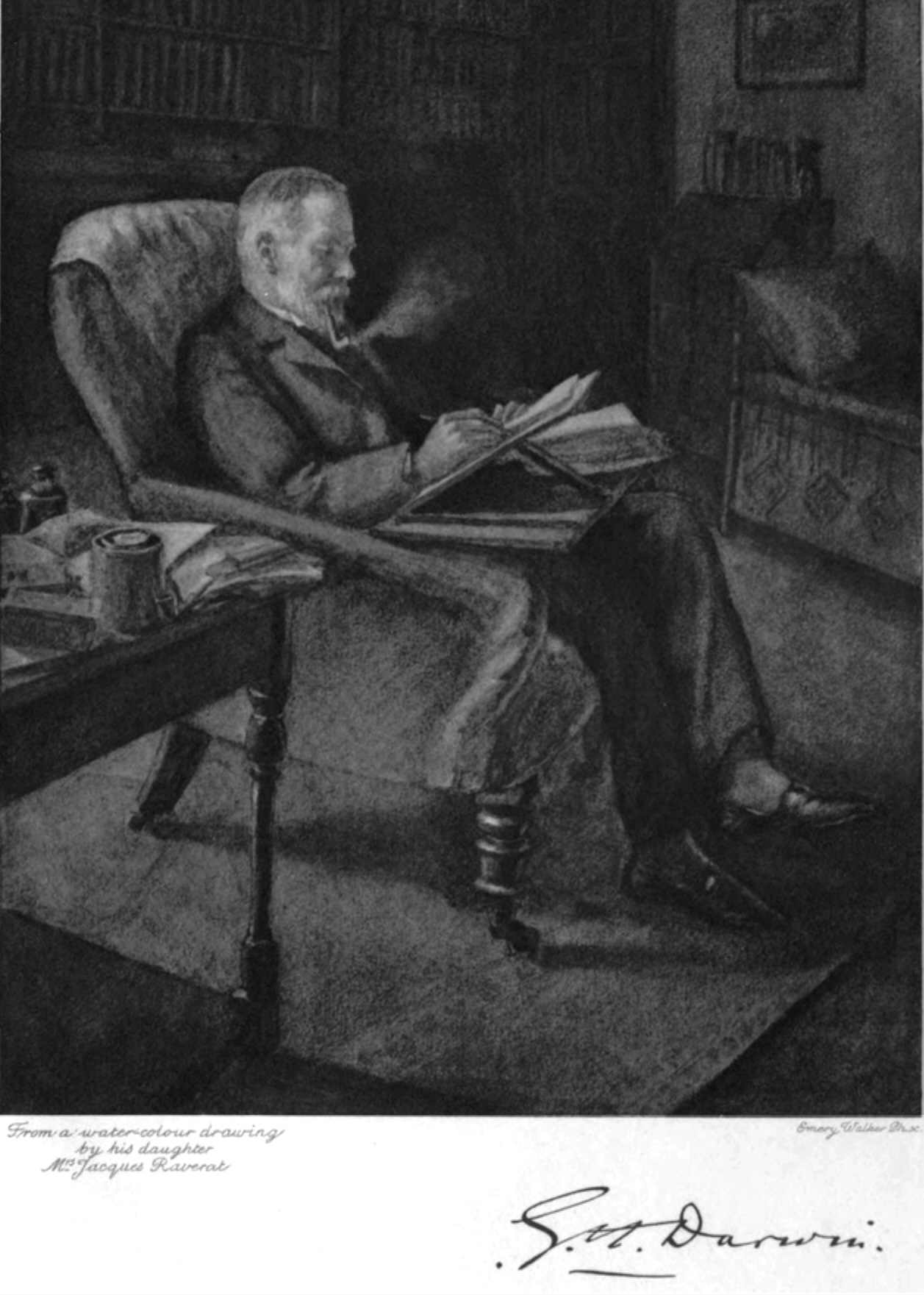
George Darwin ca 1908 by his daughter Gwen Raverat

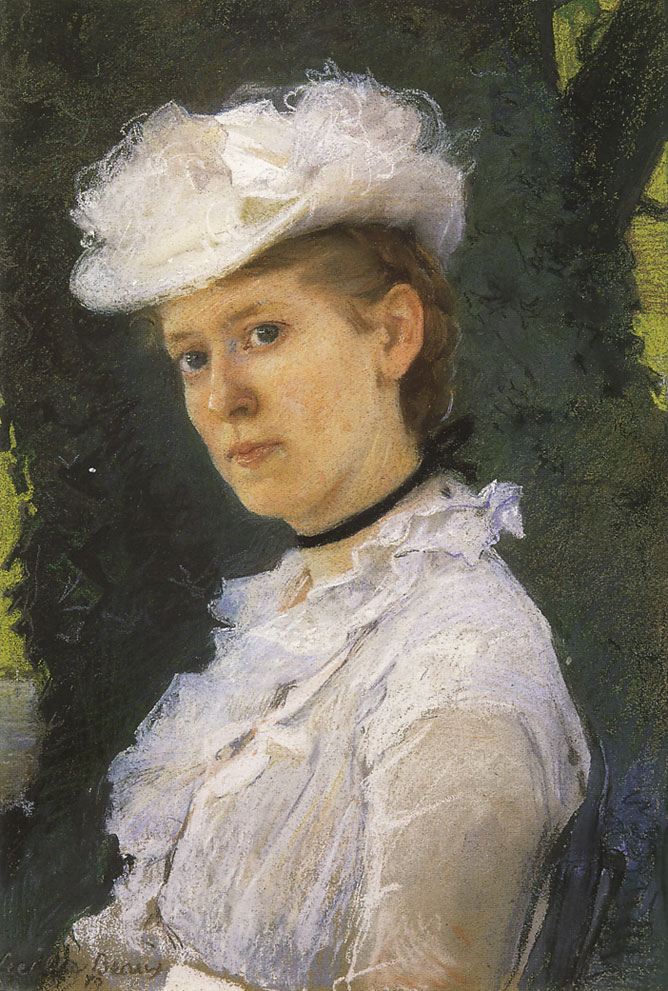
Maud DePuy Darwin, pastel, Cecilia Beaux, 1889

== Works ==
- "Tides". Encyclopædia Britannica (9th ed.). 1875–1889.
- The tides and kindred phenomena in the solar system (Boston, Houghton, 1899)
- Problems connected with the tides of a viscous spheroid (London, Harrison and Sons, 1879–1882)
- Scientific papers (Volume 1): Oceanic tides and lunar disturbances of gravity (Cambridge : University Press, 1907)
- Scientific papers (Volume 2): Tidal friction and cosmogony. (Cambridge : University Press, 1908)
- Scientific papers (Volume 3): Figures of equilibrium of rotating liquid and geophysical investigations. (Cambridge : University Press, 1908)
- Scientific papers (Volume 4): Periodic orbits and miscellaneous papers. (Cambridge : University Press, 1911)
- Scientific papers (Volume 5) Supplementary volume, containing biographical memoirs by Sir Francis Darwin and Professor E. W. Brown, lectures on Hill's lunar theory, etc... (Cambridge : University Press, 1916)
- The Scientific Papers of Sir George Darwin. 1907. Cambridge University Press (rep. by Cambridge University Press, 2009; ISBN 978-1-108-00449-7)

=== Articles ===
- "On Beneficial Restrictions to Liberty of Marriage," The Contemporary Review, Vol. XXII, June/November 1873.
- "Commodities Versus Labour," The Contemporary Review, Vol. XXII, June/November 1873.
- "Professor Whitney on the Origin of Language", The Contemporary Review, Vol. XXIV, November 1874.
- "The Birth of a Satellite" Harper's Monthly Magazine, December 1903, pages 124 to 130.
