= The Shamba Raiders =

1972 book by Bruce Kinloch

The Shamba Raiders: Memories of a Game Warden
- Cover of the 1988 Second Edition
- Author: Bruce Kinloch
- Language: English
- Subject: Game wardens--Uganda--Biography Game protection--Uganda African elephant--Control African elephant--Anecdotes
- Genre: Non-fiction
- Publisher: Collins; Harvill Press, Ashford
- Publication date: 1972
- ISBN: 978-0-00-261751-2
- LC Class: SK354.K55 A3
- Text: The Shamba Raiders: Memories of a Game Warden at Internet Archive

The Shamba Raiders: Memories of a Game Warden is Bruce Kinloch's account of his experiences in late colonial East Africa. The first edition, published in 1972 proved so successful that a second edition was published in 1988, and a third in 2004.

The title refers to the marauding elephants destroying peasant crops, driven by heavy poaching pressure in wilderness areas, which formed the most urgent task for Kinloch.

That his book is still in demand is a source of pride to him and his wife, Elizabeth, who accompanied him frequently and typed up the notes of his original book. "It is a book that never dies, its contents are as relevant now as ever," she said.

The Shamba Raiders is an account of the struggle to preserve herds of game threatened by modern civilisation, poaching, war and the political and economic changes which have swept Africa in the middle of the last century. As the Chief Game Warden in Uganda, Tanzania and Malawi, Kinloch walked the tight rope of retaining Africa's wildlife heritage while safeguarding crops and livelihood of the population, featuring ivory poachers and middlemen as well as uncaring and bigoted officials.

In particular, the book describes Kinloch's management of the Uganda Game and Fisheries Department during the introduction of the Protectorate's first National Parks, the introduction of Nile Perch to the upper Victoria Nile, and the creation of the College of African Wildlife Management.
