= Henry Brind =

British diplomat (1927–2020)

Arthur Henry Brind CMG (4 July 1927 – 3 November 2020) was a British diplomat.

== Career ==
Brind was educated at St John's College, Cambridge and joined the Colonial Service in 1950, serving in the Gold Coast (later Ghana) until 1960.

He then transferred to HM Diplomatic Service. Brind was ambassador to Somalia (1977–1980); visiting research fellow at Chatham House (1981–1982); and finally High Commissioner to Malawi (1983–1987).

He died on 3 November 2020.

Diplomatic posts
Preceded by John Shaw	British Ambassador to Somalia; 1977–1980	Succeeded by Michael Purcell
Preceded by William Peters	British High Commissioner to Malawi; 1983–1987	Succeeded by Denis Osborne

== Honours ==
- Companion of the Order of St Michael and St George (CMG) - 1973
