= Nigel Wenban-Smith =

British diplomat

William Nigel Wenban-Smith CMG (born 1 September 1936) is a former British diplomat.

== Early life ==
Wenban-Smith was the son of William Wenban-Smith, a colonial administrator who served in the former Nyasaland (now Malawi). He was educated at The King's School, Canterbury followed by King's College, Cambridge, where he completed a Bachelor of Arts degree. He spent his national service in the Royal Navy.

== Career ==
After national service, Wenban-Smith became a Plebiscite Supervisory Officer in the Southern Cameroons (now Ambazonia) from 1960 to 1961. At the time, this region was deciding to join Nigeria or become part of Cameroon, and he had some difficulty in communicating the exact terms of federation with Cameroon to voters.

He was then an Assistant Principal with the Commonwealth Relations Office - which would eventually be merged with the Foreign Office. Following diplomatic postings in the Democratic Republic of the Congo, Uganda, Ireland, and Belgium, he became Commissioner for the British Indian Ocean Territory (1982–1985) and then Deputy High Commissioner in Ottawa (1986–1989). In 1990 he was appointed High Commissioner to Malawi, succeeding Denis Osborne.

In retirement he served as Chairman of the Friends of the Chagos Islands Association, and a founding member of the Chagos Conservation Trust. He later earned an MA from the University of Buckingham. He co-wrote a comprehensive history of the islands in the Chagos Archipelago, 'Chagos: A History – Exploration, Exploitation, Expulsion, published in 2016.

== Bibliography ==
- Chagos: A History – Exploration, Exploitation, Expulsion, Nigel Wenban-Smith and Marina Carter, Chagos Conservation Trust 2016, ISBN 9780995459601

Diplomatic posts
Preceded by Denis Osborne	British High Commissioner to Malawi; 1990-1993	Succeeded by John Martin
