= List of high commissioners of the United Kingdom to Malawi =

British High Commissioner to Malawi
- Royal arms of His Majesty's Government
- Incumbent; Leigh Stubblefield since 2025
- Reports to: Secretary of State for Foreign, Commonwealth and Development Affairs
- Inaugural holder: David Cole; First High Commissioner to Malawi
- Formation: 1964
- Website: www.gov.uk/world/malawi

The high commissioner of the United Kingdom to Malawi is the United Kingdom's foremost diplomatic representative to the Republic of Malawi, and head of the UK's diplomatic mission in Malawi.

As fellow members of the Commonwealth of Nations, the United Kingdom and Malawi exchange high commissioners rather than ambassadors.

== List of heads of mission ==
=== High commissioners to Malawi ===
- 1964–1967: David Cole
- 1967–1971: Thomas Tull
- 1971–1973: Robin Haydon
- 1973–1977: Kenneth Ritchie
- 1977–1979: Michael Scott
- 1980–1983: William Peters
- 1983–1987: Henry Brind
- 1987–1990: Denis Osborne
- 1990–1993: Nigel Wenban-Smith
- 1993–1998: John Martin
- 1998–2001: George Finlayson
- 2001–2004: Norman Ling

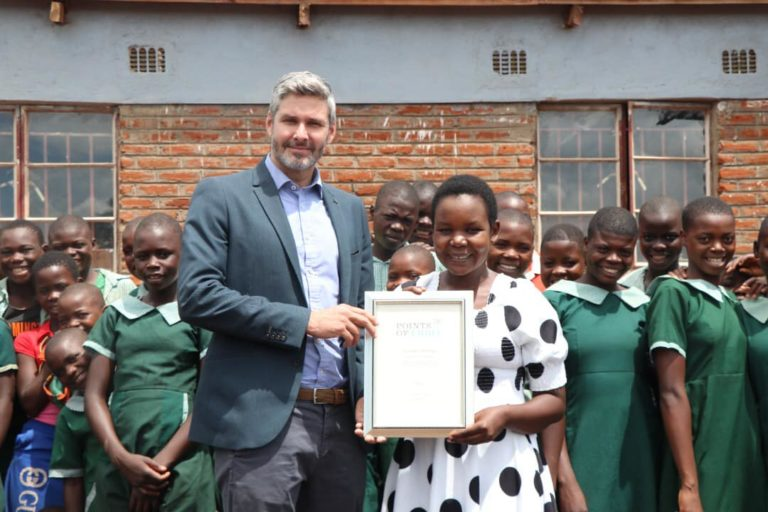
Temwani Chilenga presented with her award by, David Beer, the British High Commissioner to Malawi in 2022

- 2004–2006: David Pearey
- 2006–2009: Richard Wildash
- 2009–2011: Fergus Cochrane-Dyet (expelled 2011)
- 2011–2012: Kirk Hollingsworth (chargé d'affaires)
- 2012–2016: Michael Nevin
- 2016: Simon Mustard (temporary)
- 2017–2020: Holly Tett
- 2020–2022: David Beer
- 2022–2025: Fiona Ritchie
- 2025-present: Leigh Stubblefield
