= Bruce Kinloch =

British Army officer and conservationist (1919–2011)

- Born: 27 August 1919; India
- Died: 21 June 2011 (aged 91); Herefordshire, England
- Military career
- Allegiance: British
- Branch: British Army
- Service years: 1939–1947
- Rank: Major
- Unit: 3rd Gurkha Rifles
- Conflicts: Battle of Sittang River Bridge
- Awards: Military Cross
- Other work: Game warden and author

Bruce Kinloch MC (27 August 1919 – 21 June 2011) was a British army officer, wildlife conservation leader and author.

He was born at Saharanpur in India and educated at Berkhamsted School in England.

== Military career ==
Kinloch was commissioned into the 3rd Queen Alexandra's Own Gurkha Rifles after leaving Sandhurst in 1939, fought with them in Burma and on the Northwest Frontier, and won the Military Cross for his part in Battle of Sittang River Bridge in 1942. At the age of twenty-five, he commanded a battalion.

== Conservation career ==
In 1947, Kinloch joined the Colonial Administrative Service, first as a Game Ranger on the Kilifi Coast of Kenya. He was Chief Game Warden in the Uganda Game and Fisheries Department for ten years; in 1960 he became Chief Game Warden of Tanganyika, a post he held until 1964. Later, he became the Chief Game Warden in Malawi.

Kinloch also founded the College of African Wildlife Management on the slopes of Kilimanjaro which has trained thousands of game wardens.

== Later life ==
Kinloch wrote several non-fiction books. Among these are Sauce for the Mongoose 1965 and The Shamba Raiders 1972, which was reprinted in 1988 and again in 2004. Major Kinloch lived with his wife Elizabeth at Scotch Firs in Fownhope, Herefordshire.

== Bibliography ==
- Sauce for the Mongoose (1964)
- Shamba Raiders: Memories of a Game Warden. (1972)
- Wildhüter in Afrika. (1978, in German.)
- Game wardens in Africa (1981, English translation of Wildhüter in Afrika.)
- Tales from a Crowded Life (2009)
