= Erasto B. Mpemba =

Tanzanian game warden and scientist (1950–2023)

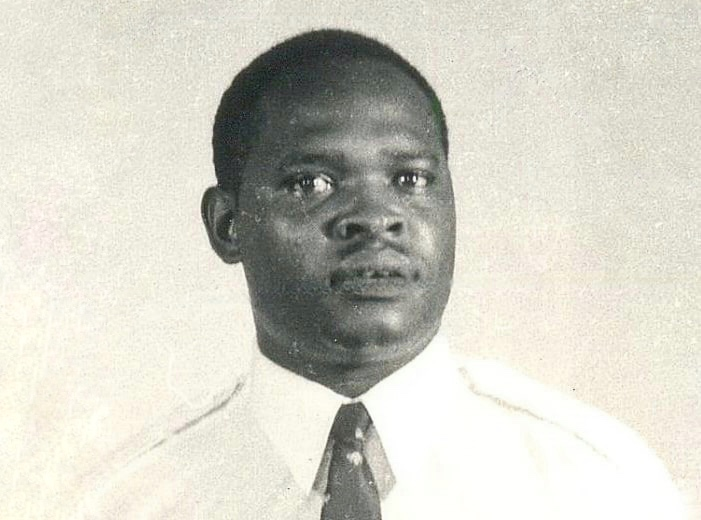
- Mpemba as a schoolboy (~1963)
- Born: Erasto Bartholomeo Mpemba; 1950; Tanganyika Territory
- Died: May 14, 2023 (aged 73) (Note: Conflicting sources: According to TRT he died on May 14, 2023, aged 73; according to his coauthor's widow, he died around 2020.); Tanzania
- Education: College of African Wildlife Management; University of Canberra (BS); Sul Ross State University (MS)
- Known for: Mpemba effect
- Scientific career
- Fields: Natural resource management
- Workplaces: Ministry of Natural Resources and Tourism

Erasto Bartholomeo Mpemba (1950–2023) was a Tanzanian game warden who, as a schoolboy, discovered the eponymous Mpemba effect, a paradoxical phenomenon in which hot water freezes faster than cold water under certain conditions.

== Life ==
Mpemba was born in 1950. He visited the Magamba Secondary School in Tanganyika, where he rediscovered the Mpemba effect when he was 13 years old.

Mpemba aspired to become a doctor, but financial constraints hindered his ambitions. Recognizing that working with wildlife presented an opportunity for an overseas scholarship, he enrolled in Mweka Wildlife College in Moshi. Upon earning his diploma, Mpemba rose to the position of Regional Natural Resources Officer in Mara Region in 1967. It took him eight years to fulfill his goal of studying abroad: He studied Natural Resource Management at the Canberra College of Advanced Education (now University of Canberra) in Australia, subsequently earning a master’s degree at Sul Ross State University in Alpine, USA. He later became Principal Game Officer for the Tanzanian Ministry of Natural Resources and Tourism and vice-chairmen of the African Forestry and Wildlife Commission's working party on the management of wildlife in 2002. He had retired from the Tanzanian Ministry as of 2011.

Mpemba was married and had children; his wife was a doctor. Mpemba's death is not well-documented; according to Christine Osborne, the widow of the physicist who played a key role in documenting and publishing Mpemba's findings, he died around 2020. However, TRT reports that he died on May 14, 2023.

== Discovery of Mpemba effect ==
Mpemba discovered the phenomenon at Magamba Secondary School in 1963 while preparing ice cream in a cooking course. Due to lack of time, he skipped the cooling phase when preparing the ice cream and immediately put it into the freezer; unexpectedly, his milk mixture froze faster than that of his classmates. His physics teacher at the time told him that his observation was clearly not possible. A few years later, the head of Mpemba's school invited British physicist Denis Osborne (1932–2014) from the University of Dar es Salaam to give a guest lecture on his work. At the end of the presentation, Mpemba asked the question that had been bothering him for so long: “If you take two beakers with equal volumes of water, one at 35°C and the other at 100°C, and put them into a refrigerator, the one that started at 100°C freezes first. Why?” Teachers and classmates present thought the claim absurd and mocked Mpemba for the question.

Osborne was also caught off guard, but later invited Mpemba to the university in Dar es Salaam to test his observations. In these tests, the pair were able to find some evidence for Mpemba's claim; however, Osborne admitted that these tests were crude and required more sophisticated reproduction to confirm. Subsequent studies have proven inconclusive, with researchers noting the difficulty of accurately determining when water has completely frozen, as well as the large variations in measurements when measured even slightly imprecisely. In 1969, during Mpemba's studies at the College of African Wildlife Management near Moshi, a paper that he and Osborne had written on the phenomenon was published.
