= David Cole (diplomat) =

British diplomat

Sir David Lee Cole, KCMG, MC (31 August 1920 – 28 May 1997) was a British diplomat. He was British High Commissioner to Malawi from 1964 to 1967 and British Ambassador to Thailand from 1973 to 1978.

== Biography ==
Cole was born at Newmarket, Suffolk, the son of Brigadier D. H. Cole, CBE, LittD, and Charlotte Cole (née Wedgwood). Cole was educated at Cheltenham College and Sidney Sussex College, Cambridge, where he was an exhibitioner and took first-class honours in History. His university studies were interrupted after one year by the Second World War, in which he served with the Royal Inniskilling Fusiliers, with the service number of 164913, from 1940 to 1945 in India, Iran, Madagascar, and Italy. He was awarded the Military Cross in 1944, for his actions during the crossing of the Garigliano river.

Joining the Dominions Office in 1947, Cole was seconded to the Foreign Office for service with the UK Delegation to the United Nations in New York from 1948 to 1951. He was First Secretary at the British High Commission in New Delhi from 1953 to 1956, private secretary to the Earl of Home, (Secretary of State for Commonwealth Relations and Lord President of the Council) from 1957 to 1960, and head of the Personnel Department at the Commonwealth Relations Office from 1961 to 1963.

He was British Deputy High Commissioner to Ghana from 1963 to 1964, British High Commissioner to Malawi from 1964 to 1967, Minister (Political) at the British High Commission in New Delhi from 1957 to 1960, Assistant Under-Secretary of State at the Foreign and Commonwealth Office from 1970 to 1973, and British Ambassador to Thailand from 1973 to 1978, when he retired from HM Diplomatic Service.

Cole was appointed CMG in 1965 and promoted KCMG in 1975.

== Family ==
Cole married in 1945 Dorothy Patton; they had one son. Lady Cole died in 2018.

== Publications ==
- Thailand: Watercolour Impressions (Allied Printers, 1977)
- Rough Road to Rome: A Foot-soldier in Sicily and Italy, 1943–44 (William Kimber & Co Ltd, 1983)
