= John Francis Ryde Martin =

- Born: 8 February 1943
- Died: 5 January 1999 (aged 55)
- Occupation: British diplomat

John Francis Ryde Martin CMG (8 February 1943 – 5 January 1999) was a British diplomat.

== Biography ==
Born on 8 February 1943, John Martin was educated at Bedford School and at Brasenose College, Oxford. He joined the British Diplomatic Service in 1966 and, following diplomatic postings in Argentina, Greece, Cyprus, Nigeria and at the United Nations, he served as British High Commissioner to Malawi between 1993 and 1998.

John Martin died on 5 January 1999.

Diplomatic posts
Preceded by Nigel Wenban-Smith	British High Commissioner to Malawi; 1993–1998	Succeeded by George Finlayson
