= Denis Osborne =

British diplomat and academic (1932–2014)

Denis Gordon Osborne CMG (17 September 1932 – 3 September 2014) was a British diplomat and academic.

== Early life ==
Osborne was educated at Dr Challoner's Grammar School in Amersham and University College, Durham, where he graduated with a first-class degree in Physics in 1953. He completed a PhD at the same institution.

== Career ==
From 1957 he was a Durham University lecturer in physics, including a period in 1958 lecturing in Sierra Leone at Fourah Bay College - then affiliated with Durham. He stayed in Africa and became Senior Lecturer in Physics at the University of Ghana, but was eventually arrested and imprisoned by the government of Kwame Nkrumah. In 1964 he joined the University of Dar es Salaam as Reader in Physics, becoming Professor in 1966 and dean of science in 1968.

After a student in a physics lecture, Erasto Mpemba, asked him why hot water sometimes freezes faster than cold water, Osborne experimented to confirm Mpemba's observation, and together they co-authored a paper on what is now known as the Mpemba effect.

In 1971, he served as a consultant with the World Bank in Malaysia, and in Ethiopia the following year. Osborne left his academic career behind in 1972 when he joined the Civil Service, serving within the Overseas Development Administration. He became Head of the East and West Africa Department in 1984 and in 1987 was picked to serve as High Commissioner in Malawi.

Osborne later worked as an independent development consultant. He donated some of his personal papers relating to his time in Africa to the Bodleian Library.

== Personal ==
Osborne was a member of the Athenaeum.

Diplomatic posts
Preceded by Henry Brind	British High Commissioner to Malawi; 1987-1990	Succeeded by Nigel Wenban-Smith
