= Sauce for the Mongoose =

2009 Book by Bruce Kinloch

- Author: Bruce Kinloch
- Publication date: 1964
- ISBN: 0006134475

Sauce for the Mongoose: The Story of a Real-Life Rikki-tikki-tavi (ISBN 0006134475) by Bruce Kinloch is a non-fiction tale of how a family adopts a baby mongoose who they name "Pipa", the word for barrel in Swahili.

The book also contains black and white plates in the center with pictures of the author, his family and Pipa.

Reviewers described the book as "fascinating" and "entertaining".
