= College of African Wildlife Management =

College near Mweka

- Other name: Mweka College
- Motto: We hold it in trust
- Established: 1963
- Founder: Bruce Kinloch
- Rector: Jafari R. Kideghesho
- Total staff: 150
- Location: Mweka, Kilimanjaro, Tanzania; 3.241394°S 37.326871°E
- Language: English
- Website: www.mwekawildlife.ac.tz

- Location within Tanzania

The College of African Wildlife Management (CAWM), commonly known as Mweka College or just Mweka, is located near the village of that name on the southern slopes of Mount Kilimanjaro in Tanzania, above the city of Moshi, about 14 kilometres north of its centre.

The locality also gives its name to the Mweka Trail, one of the routes on Kilimanjaro, used for the descent.

Following the independence of Tanganyika in 1961, the College of African Wildlife Management was established in 1963 by Bruce Kinloch as a pioneer institution for the training of African wildlife managers. Initial funding for Mweka was provided by the African Wildlife Leadership Foundation (now known as the African Wildlife Foundation), the U.S. Agency for International Development, and the Frankfurt Zoological Society, with facilities donated by the government of Tanganyika. Since this time, the College has trained over 5,000 wildlife managers from 52 countries worldwide (28 African countries and 24 other countries in the world), the majority are working in protected areas throughout sub-Saharan Africa.

In the mid-2010s, the college's 30 million tanzanian shillings annual tuition fees made it inaccessible for most Tanzanian students, and the few students in attendance mostly originated from abroad. The college became more accessible when it reduced its tuition fee to less than 4 million tanzanian shillings in the late 2010s. Since then, the vast majority of the College's students come from Tanzania, with a minority coming from the broader SADC region.

However, the college still opens its doors to all students with an interest in African wildlife management. Some alumni students also came from Western and Eastern Europe, and countries such as the United States, India, Sri Lanka, and Japan among many others.

Map of Mount Kilimanjaro with Mweka and Moshi south from the peak

The college has two main aims:

- To prepare both local and international students for work within the national parks and reserves of Tanzania and the rest of Africa.
- To prepare students for work within the safari industries (photographic & hunting) within Tanzania and Africa as a whole.

== Notable alumni ==
- Erasto Mpemba, discoverer of the Mpemba effect, who published his results while a student at the College.
- Job Ndugai, politician.
