= Recalescence =

Recalescence is an increase in temperature that occurs while cooling metal when a change in structure with an increase in entropy occurs. The heat responsible for the change in temperature is due to the change in entropy. When a structure transformation occurs the Gibbs free energy of both structures are more or less the same. Therefore, the process will be exothermic. The heat provided is the latent heat.

Recalescence also occurs after supercooling, when the supercooled liquid suddenly crystallizes, forming a solid but releasing heat in the process.

== See also ==
- Allotropy
- Phase transition
- Thermal analysis
