= Uganda Game and Fisheries Department =

Wildlife conservation agency of the Uganda Protectorate

- Logo of the Game Department

Government Department overview
- Jurisdiction: Uganda Protectorate
- Headquarters: Entebbe, Uganda
- Government Department executive: Warden
- Child agencies: Game Ranges (6); Fisheries Regions (3)

Map
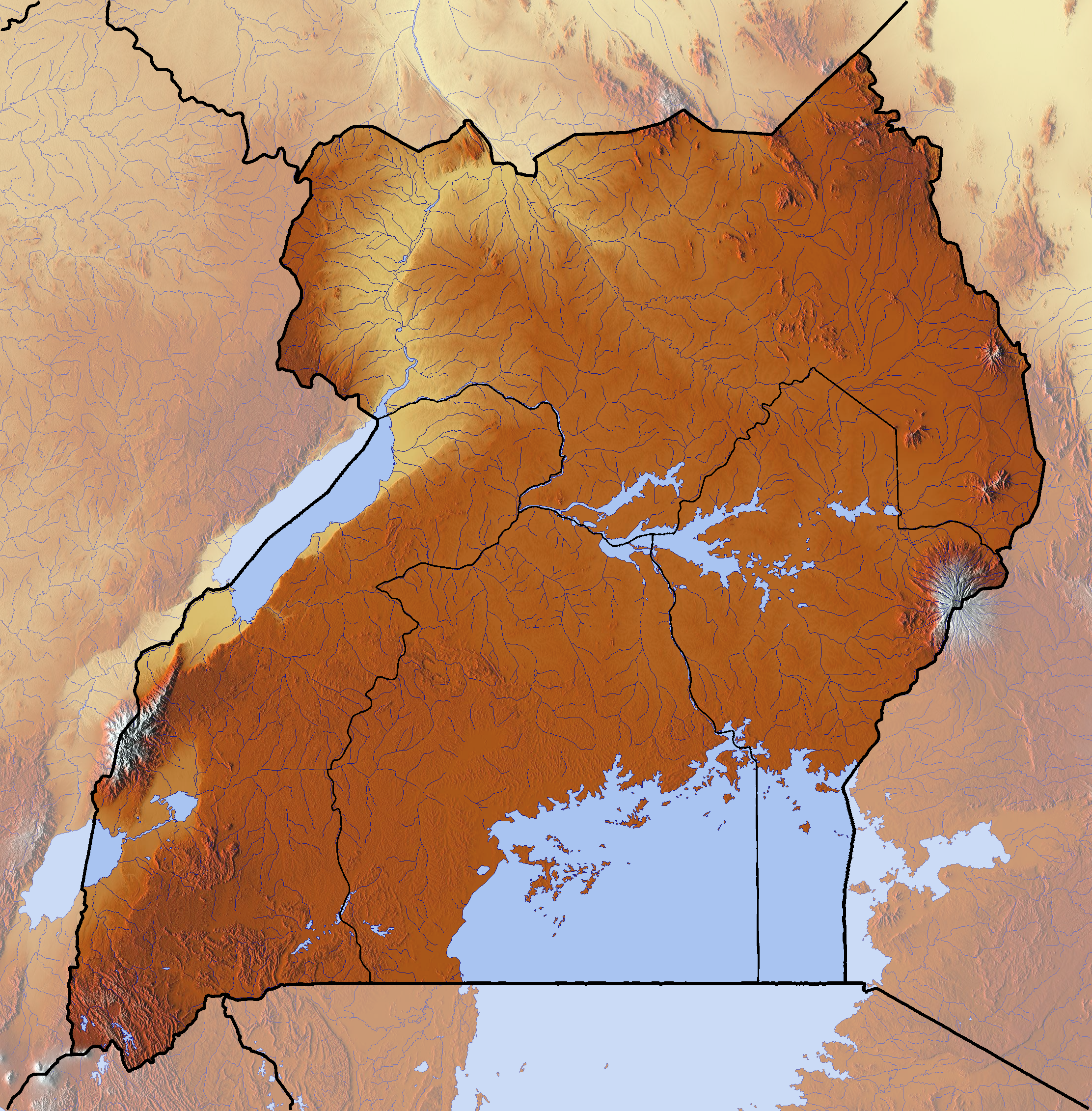

The Uganda Game and Fisheries Department was the principal wildlife conservation and fisheries management agency of the Uganda Protectorate from 1924 until its dissolution in 1996. The department played a crucial role in establishing Uganda's early conservation framework and managing the country's abundant wildlife resources during the colonial and early post-independence periods. It was merged into the Uganda Wildlife Authority in 1996.

== History and Establishment ==
The Uganda Game and Fisheries Department was established in 1924 as part of the colonial administration's efforts to regulate hunting and protect wildlife populations in the Uganda Protectorate. The department was created in response to concerns about declining wildlife populations due to uncontrolled hunting and the need for systematic conservation measures. The organization was headed by a Director who held the title of Warden and later Chief Warden, with Charles Pitman serving as one of the notable early leaders from 1924 until his departure, being replaced 1951 by Bruce Kinloch.

The department's mandate encompassed both terrestrial wildlife conservation and fisheries management, reflecting the integrated approach to natural resource management adopted during the colonial period. This dual responsibility made it unique among colonial wildlife agencies in East Africa, as it addressed both land and aquatic ecosystems within a single administrative framework.

== Functions and Responsibilities ==
The Uganda Game and Fisheries Department was responsible for implementing wildlife protection laws, managing game reserves, and overseeing fishing activities across Uganda's numerous lakes and rivers. The department established the foundation for modern wildlife management in Uganda, including the creation of protected areas and the development of sustainable hunting practices. Its fisheries division focused on regulating fishing activities, collecting catch statistics, and promoting sustainable fishing practices among local communities who depended on fish as a primary protein source.

The department also played a crucial role in scientific research and data collection, working with international organizations such as the Food and Agriculture Organization (FAO) to improve fisheries statistics and management practices. This scientific approach to resource management was pioneering for its time and established important precedents for evidence-based conservation policies.

== Dissolution and Legacy ==
In August 1996, the Uganda Game and Fisheries Department was dissolved and merged with the Uganda National Parks Department to form the Uganda Wildlife Authority (UWA) under the Uganda Wildlife Statute. This merger was part of broader government reforms aimed at creating more efficient and comprehensive wildlife management institutions in post-independence Uganda.

The transition marked the end of an era in Uganda's conservation history, as the department had been instrumental in establishing many of the country's conservation practices and protected areas. The legacy of the Uganda Game and Fisheries Department continues through the Uganda Wildlife Authority, which inherited many of its functions and responsibilities. The department's historical approach to integrating wildlife and fisheries management under a single authority has influenced contemporary conservation strategies in Uganda and across East Africa.
