= List of things named after Peter Debye =

The article is a list of things named after the Dutchman P. J. W. Debye.

- Debye – a unit of electric dipole moment
- Debye–Falkenhagen effect
- Debye–Hückel equation
  - Debye–Hückel limiting law, see Debye–Hückel equation
  - Debye–Hückel theory, see Debye–Hückel equation
- Debye scattering equation
- Debye–Scherrer method, see Powder diffraction
  - Debye–Scherrer rings, see Debye–Scherrer method
- Debye–Sears method
- Debye–Waller factor
- Debye force
- Debye frequency, see also Debye model
- Debye function, see also Debye model
- Debye length
- Debye model
- Debye relaxation
- Debye sheath
- Debye shielding
- Debye temperature, see also Debye model
- Lorenz–Mie–Debye theory
- Rayleigh–Gans–Debye approximation

== Astronomical objects ==
- 30852 Debye
- Debye (crater)

== Others ==
- Debye Institute for Nanomaterial(s) Science, at the University of Utrecht
- Debye Street and Debye Square, in Maastricht.
- Peter Debye Award

== See also ==
- Debye (disambiguation)
