= Born–von Karman boundary condition =

Periodic boundary condition in solid-state physics

The Born–von Karman boundary condition requires the wave function to be periodic on a certain Bravais lattice. Named after Max Born and Theodore von Kármán, this periodic boundary condition is often applied in solid-state physics to model an ideal crystal. Born and von Kármán published a series of articles in 1912 and 1913 that presented this model of the specific heat of solids based on the crystalline hypothesis and included this boundary condition. Historically, the Born-von Karman boundary condition is, like the Debye model, an improvement upon the Einstein model of solids, the first quantum theory of specific heats.

The condition can be stated as

$$\psi(\mathbf{r}+N_i \mathbf{a}_i)=\psi(\mathbf{r}), \,$$

where i runs over the dimensions of the Bravais lattice, the a_{i} are the primitive vectors of the lattice, and the N_{i} are integers (assuming the lattice has N cells where N=N_{1}N_{2}N_{3}). This definition can be used to show that

$$\psi(\mathbf{r}+\mathbf{T})=\psi(\mathbf{r})$$

for any lattice translation vector T such that:

$$\mathbf{T} = \sum_i N_i \mathbf{a}_i.$$

Note, however, the Born–von Karman boundary conditions are useful when N_{i} are large (infinite).

The Born–von Karman boundary condition is important in solid-state physics for analyzing many features of crystals, such as diffraction and the band gap. Modeling the potential of a crystal as a periodic function with the Born–von Karman boundary condition and plugging in Schrödinger's equation results in a proof of Bloch's theorem, which is particularly important in understanding the band structure of crystals.
