= Debye (disambiguation) =

The debye (symbol: D) is a unit of electric dipole moment named after physicist Peter J. W. Debye

Debye may also refer to:

- Peter Debye (1884–1966), Dutch physicist, physical chemist and Nobel laureate in Chemistry
  - 30852 Debye, a main-belt asteroid named after Peter Debye
  - Debye (crater), a lunar crater named after Peter Debye
  - List of things named after Peter Debye

== See also ==
- De Bie (more common form of the Dutch surname)
