= Sybe I. Rispens =

Dutch writer, scientist and entrepreneur (born 1969)

- Born: Dr. Sybe Izaak Rispens; April 17, 1969 (age 57); Dokkum, Netherlands
- Education: University of Groningen
- Occupations: Writer, cyber security expert, entrepreneur

Sybe I. Rispens (born April 17, 1969) is a Dutch writer, scientist and cyber security expert.

== Education and Work ==
Rispens was born in Dokkum, Netherlands on April 17, 1969. He received his bachelor's degree in Electronic Engineering from the Noordelijke Hogeschool Leeuwarden, before further completing his master's degree at TU-Twente. He received his Master's in the Philosophy of Science from the University of Amsterdam in 1996. In 2005, Rispens was awarded a PhD in the History of Artificial Intelligence from Rijksuniversiteit Groningen with the dissertation, Machine Reason: A History of Clocks, Computers and Consciousness. He is a certified ISO27001 IT-security consultant.

Rispens is a prolific writer and contributor to such publications as the Dutch periodicals Natuurwetenschap en Techniek, Intermediair, and NRC Handelsblad, and the German newspaper, Die Zeit and the Swiss newspaper Neue Zürcher Zeitung. He has published several books, including Einstein in Nederland: Een intellectuele biografie in 2006 and co-authored The Communication Revolution: New Perspectives on Photonics‘ in 2010.

In 2007, Rispens founded the ICT and security consulting and software production company knowledgeatwork UG. The organisation specializes in secure, GxP-certified software and developing industry-grade, ISO27000 certified applications. In 2011, he co-founded the former Institut für Wissenschafts- und Technologiekommunikation GmbH (IWTK) in Berlin Germany, a privately held company that focuses on innovation processes in research and technology-centered organizations.

Currently Rispens works as a senior cyber security expert for organisations in the medical sector, critical infrastructures, and payment service providers. He publishes on topics related to cyber security on https://medium.com/@drrispens.

== Peter Debye Controversy ==
In Rispens’ 2006 book, Einstein in Nederland: Een intellectuele biografie (Einstein in the Netherlands: An Intellectual Biography), he revealed that during the period of 1933–1945, Albert Einstein was upset by Nobel Prize winning chemist Peter Debye, whom Einstein believed to be serving the Third Reich more than he considered ethically correct.

Rispens cited a memo written by Debye during his time as Director of the Physics Section at Kaiser Wilhelm Institute in Berlin, which reads:

“In light of the current situation, membership by German Jews as stipulated by the Nuremberg laws, of the Deutsche Physikalische Gesellschaft cannot be continued. According to the wishes of the board, I ask of all members to whom these definitions apply to report to me their resignation. Heil Hitler.”

The release of this information inspired a monograph and several formal investigations. Two prominent Dutch universities--Utrecht University and the University of Maastricht—hastily denounced Debye and stripped him of his honors a decision that was later reversed.

The Cornell University department of Chemistry and Chemical Biology's investigation found the information to be insufficient to warrant distancing themselves from Debye's legacy. Another investigation by the NIOD Institute for War, Holocaust and Genocide Studies concluded that Debye was an “opportunist” who “showed himself to be loyal to the dominant political system, first in the Third Reich and then in the United States, while at the same time keeping the back door open: in the Third Reich by retaining his Dutch nationality, in the United States by attempting to secretly maintain some contacts with Nazi Germany via the Foreign Office.”

== Publications ==
‘Einstein in Nederland. Een intellectuele biografie‘, Ambo: Amsterdam 2006, 242 S. With 16 Images and Index.

‘The Communication Revolution: New Perspectives on Photonics‘, Technische Universiteit Eindhoven: Eindhoven, 2010

‘Machine Reason. Clocks, Computers and Consciousness‘, Groningen, 2005, 252 p.
