= De Bie =

De Bie is a surname of Dutch origin. "De bie" (modern spelling "de bij") means "the bee", and the surname can be of metonymic occupational origin, e.g. a paternal ancestor may have been a bee-keeper. Other origins could be an address ("from a house with a sign of a bee") or be metaphorical (e.g. a busy person). Variant spellings include De Bij, De Bije, De By, De Bye, DeBie, Debije and Debye.

People with this name include:

De Bie

- Adriaen de Bie (1593–1668), Flemish painter
- Amadeus de Bie (1844–1920), Belgian abbot
- Cornelis de Bie (1621–1664), Dutch landscape painter
- Cornelis de Bie (1627–1715), Flemish rhetorician, poet and jurist
- Danny De Bie (born 1960), Belgian cyclocross racer
- Erasmus de Bie (1629–1675), Flemish land- and cityscape painter
- Erik Scott de Bie (born 1983), American fantasy author
- Jacob de Bie (1581 – c. 1640), Flemish engraver, publisher and numismatist
- Jan de Bie (1946–2021), Dutch painter and photographer
- Jean de Bie (1892–1961), Belgian football goalkeeper
- Mark De Bie (born 1939), Belgian television writer
- René De Bie (born 1945), Belgian racing cyclist
- Sean De Bie (born 1991), Belgian racing cyclist
- Silvy De Bie (born 1981), Belgian dance vocalist
- Thomas De Bie (born 1991), Belgian football goalkeeper
- Wim de Bie (1939–2023), Dutch comedian (half of the Dutch comedy duo "Van Kooten en De Bie")
- Wouly de Bie (born 1958), Dutch water polo player

DeBie/ Debie

- Benoît Debie (born 1968), Belgian cinematographer

De Bij/ De By

- Herman de By (1873–1961), Dutch swimmer

De Bije/ De Bye

- Marcus de Bye (1638/39–aft.1688), Dutch painter and engraver

Debije / Debye

- Peter Debye (1884–1966), Dutch physicist and Nobel-laureate
