= Rotational Brownian motion =

Rotational Brownian motion is the random change in the orientation of a polar molecule due to collisions with other molecules. It is an important element of theories of dielectric materials.

The polarization of a dielectric material is a competition between torques due to the imposed electric field, which tend to align the molecules, and collisions, which tend to destroy the alignment. The theory of rotational Brownian motion allows one to calculate the net result of these two competing effects, and to predict how the permittivity of a dielectric material depends on the strength and frequency of the imposed electric field.

Rotational Brownian motion was first discussed by Peter Debye, who applied Albert Einstein's theory of translational Brownian motion to the rotation of molecules having permanent electric dipoles. Debye ignored inertial effects and assumed that the molecules were spherical, with an intrinsic, fixed dipole moment. He derived expressions for the dielectric relaxation time and for the permittivity. These formulae have been successfully applied to many materials. However, Debye's expression for the permittivity predicts that the absorption tends toward a constant value when the frequency of the applied electric field becomes very large—the "Debye plateau". This is not observed; instead, the absorption tends toward a maximum and then declines with increasing frequency.

The breakdown in Debye's theory in these regimes can be corrected by including inertial effects; allowing the molecules to be non-spherical; including dipole-dipole interactions between molecules; etc. These are computationally very difficult problems and rotational Brownian motion is a topic of much current research interest.

== See also ==
- Debye relaxation
- Brownian surface
