= Debye function =

Mathematical function

In mathematics, the family of Debye functions is defined by $D_n(x) = \frac{n}{x^n} \int_0^x \frac{t^n}{e^t - 1}\,dt.$

The functions are named in honor of Peter Debye, who came across this function (with n = 3) in 1912 when he analytically computed the heat capacity of what is now called the Debye model.

== Mathematical properties ==
=== Relation to other functions ===
The Debye functions are closely related to the polylogarithm.

=== Series expansion ===
They have the series expansion $D_n(x) = 1 - \frac{n}{2(n+1)} x + n \sum_{k=1}^\infty \frac{B_{2k}}{(2k+n)(2k)!} x^{2k}, \quad |x| < 2\pi,\ n \ge 1,$ where $B_n$ is the n-th Bernoulli number.

=== Limiting values ===
$\lim_{x \to 0} D_n(x) = 1.$ If $\Gamma$ is the gamma function and $\zeta$ is the Riemann zeta function, then, for $x \gg 0$, $D_n(x) = \frac{n}{x^n} \int_0^x \frac{t^n\,dt}{e^t-1} \sim \frac{n}{x^n}\Gamma(n + 1) \zeta(n + 1), \qquad \operatorname{Re} n > 0,$

=== Derivative ===
The derivative obeys the relation $x D^{\prime}_n(x) = n \left(B(x) - D_n(x)\right),$ where $B(x) = x/(e^x-1)$ is the Bernoulli function.

== Applications in solid-state physics ==
=== The Debye model ===
The Debye model has a density of vibrational states $g_\text{D}(\omega) = \frac{9\omega^2}{\omega_\text{D}^3} \,, \qquad 0\le\omega\le\omega_\text{D}$ with the Debye frequency ω_{D}.

=== Internal energy and heat capacity ===
Inserting g into the internal energy $U = \int_0^\infty d\omega\,g(\omega)\,\hbar\omega\,n(\omega)$ with the Bose–Einstein distribution $n(\omega) = \frac{1}{\exp(\hbar\omega / k_\text{B} T)-1}.$ one obtains $U = 3 k_\text{B}T \, D_3(\hbar\omega_\text{D} / k_\text{B}T).$ The heat capacity is the derivative thereof.

=== Mean squared displacement ===
The intensity of X-ray diffraction or neutron diffraction at wavenumber q is given by the Debye-Waller factor or the Lamb-Mössbauer factor. For isotropic systems it takes the form $\exp(-2W(q)) = \exp\left(-q^2\langle u_x^2\rangle\right).$ In this expression, the mean squared displacement refers to just once Cartesian component u_{x} of the vector u that describes the displacement of atoms from their equilibrium positions. Assuming harmonicity and developing into normal modes, one obtains $2W(q) = \frac{\hbar^2 q^2}{6M k_\text{B}T} \int_0^\infty d\omega \frac{k_\text{B}T}{\hbar\omega}g(\omega) \coth\frac{\hbar\omega}{2k_\text{B}T}=\frac{\hbar^2 q^2}{6M k_\text{B}T} \int_0^\infty d\omega \frac{k_\text{B}T}{\hbar\omega} g(\omega) \left[\frac{2}{\exp(\hbar\omega/k_\text{B}T)-1}+1\right].$ Inserting the density of states from the Debye model, one obtains $2W(q) = \frac{3}{2} \frac{\hbar^2 q^2}{M\hbar\omega_\text{D}} \left[2\left(\frac{k_\text{B}T}{\hbar\omega_\text{D}}\right) D_1{\left(\frac{\hbar\omega_\text{D}}{k_\text{B}T}\right)} + \frac{1}{2}\right].$ From the above power series expansion of $D_1$ follows that the mean square displacement at high temperatures is linear in temperature $2W(q) = \frac{3 k_\text{B}T q^2}{M\omega_\text{D}^2}.$ The absence of $\hbar$ indicates that this is a classical result. Because $D_1(x)$ goes to zero for $x \to \infty$ it follows that for $T = 0$ $2W(q)=\frac{3}{4}\frac{\hbar^2 q^2}{M\hbar\omega_\text{D}}$ (zero-point motion).

== Implementations ==
- Ng, E. W.; Devine, C. J. (1970). "On the computation of Debye functions of integer orders". Math. Comp. 24 (110): 405–407. doi:10.1090/S0025-5718-1970-0272160-6. MR 0272160.
- Engeln, I.; Wobig, D. (1983). "Computation of the generalized Debye functions delta(x,y) and D(x,y)". Colloid & Polymer Science. 261: 736–743. doi:10.1007/BF01410947. S2CID 98476561.
- MacLeod, Allan J. (1996). "Algorithm 757: MISCFUN, a software package to compute uncommon special functions". ACM Trans. Math. Software. 22 (3): 288–301. doi:10.1145/232826.232846. S2CID 37814348. Fortran 77 code
- Fortran 90 version
- Maximon, Leonard C. (2003). "The dilogarithm function for complex argument". Proc. R. Soc. A. 459 (2039): 2807–2819. Bibcode:2003RSPSA.459.2807M. doi:10.1098/rspa.2003.1156. S2CID 122271244.
- Guseinov, I. I.; Mamedov, B. A. (2007). "Calculation of Integer and noninteger n-Dimensional Debye Functions using Binomial Coefficients and Incomplete Gamma Functions". Int. J. Thermophys. 28 (4): 1420–1426. Bibcode:2007IJT....28.1420G. doi:10.1007/s10765-007-0256-1. S2CID 120284032.
- C version of the GNU Scientific Library
