= Periodic boundary conditions =

Concept in molecular modelling

Periodic boundary conditions in 2D

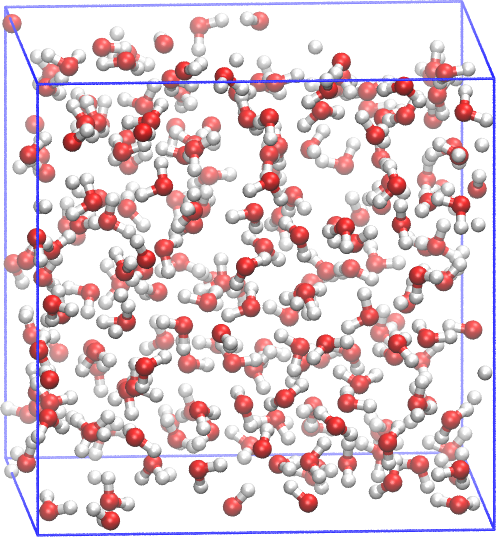
Unit cell with water molecules, used to simulate flowing water

Periodic boundary conditions (PBCs) are a set of boundary conditions that are often chosen for approximating a large (infinite) system by using a small part called a unit cell. PBCs are often used in computer simulations and mathematical models. The topology of two-dimensional PBC is equal to that of a world map in some video games; the unit cell's geometry satisfies perfect two-dimensional tiling, and after an object passes through one side of the cell, it reappears on the opposite side with the same velocity. In topological terms, the space made by two-dimensional PBCs can be thought of as being mapped onto a torus (compactification). The large systems approximated by PBCs consist of an infinite number of unit cells. In computer simulations, one of these is the original simulation box, and the others are copies called images. During the simulation, only the properties of the original simulation box must be recorded and propagated. The minimum-image convention is a common form of PBC particle bookkeeping in which each particle in the simulation interacts with the closest image of the remaining particles.

One example of periodic boundary conditions can be defined according to smooth real functions $\phi: \mathbb{R}^n \to \mathbb{R}$ by

$$\frac{\partial^m }{\partial x_1^m} \phi(a_1,x_2,...,x_n) = \frac{\partial^m }{\partial x_1^m} \phi(b_1,x_2,...,x_n),$$
$$\frac{\partial^m }{\partial x_2^m} \phi(x_1,a_2,...,x_n) = \frac{\partial^m }{\partial x_2^m} \phi(x_1,b_2,...,x_n),$$
$$... ,$$
$$\frac{\partial^m }{\partial x_n^m} \phi(x_1,x_2,...,a_n) = \frac{\partial^m }{\partial x_n^m} \phi(x_1,x_2,...,b_n)$$

for all m = 0, 1, 2, ... and for constants $a_i$ and $b_i$.

In molecular dynamics simulations and Monte Carlo molecular modeling, PBCs are usually applied to calculate properties of bulk gases, liquids, crystals, or mixtures. A common application uses PBC to simulate solvated macromolecules in a bath of explicit solvent. Born–von Karman boundary conditions are periodic boundary conditions for a special system.

In electromagnetics, PBC can be applied for different mesh types to analyze the electromagnetic properties of periodical structures.

== Requirements and artifacts ==
Three-dimensional PBCs are useful for approximating the behavior of macro-scale systems of gases, liquids, and solids. Three-dimensional PBCs can also be used to simulate planar surfaces, in which case two-dimensional PBCs are often more suitable. Two-dimensional PBCs for planar surfaces are also called slab boundary conditions; in this case, PBCs are used for two Cartesian coordinates (e.g., x and y), and the third coordinate (z) extends to infinity.

PBCs can be used in conjunction with Ewald summation methods (e.g., the particle mesh Ewald method) to calculate electrostatic forces in the system. But PBCs also introduce correlational artifacts that do not respect the translational invariance of the system, requiring constraints on the composition and size of the simulation box.

In simulations of solid systems, the strain field arising from any inhomogeneity in the system will be artificially truncated and modified by the periodic boundary. Similarly, the wavelength of sound or shock waves and phonons in the system is limited by the box size.

In simulations containing ionic (Coulomb) interactions, the net electrostatic charge of the system must be zero to avoid summing to an infinite charge when PBCs are applied. In some applications it is appropriate to obtain neutrality by adding ions such as sodium or chloride (as counterions) in appropriate numbers if the molecules of interest are charged. Sometimes ions are even added to a system in which the molecules of interest are neutral, to approximate the ionic strength of the solution in which the molecules naturally appear. Maintenance of the minimum-image convention also generally requires that a spherical cutoff radius for nonbonded forces be at most half the length of one side of a cubic box. Even in electrostatically neutral systems, a net dipole moment of the unit cell can introduce a spurious bulk-surface energy, equivalent to pyroelectricity in polar crystals. Another consequence of applying PBCs to a simulated system such as a liquid or a solid is that this hypothetical system has no contact with its "surroundings", due to it being infinite in all directions. Therefore, long-range energy contributions such as the electrostatic potential, and by extension the energies of charged particles like electrons, are not automatically aligned to experimental energy scales. Mathematically, this energy level ambiguity corresponds to the sum of the electrostatic energy being dependent on a surface term that needs to be set by the user of the method.

The size of the simulation box must also be large enough to prevent periodic artifacts from occurring due to the unphysical topology of the simulation. In a box that is too small, a macromolecule may interact with its own image in a neighboring box, which is functionally equivalent to a molecule's "head" interacting with its own "tail". This produces highly unphysical dynamics in most macromolecules, although the magnitude of the consequences and thus the appropriate box size relative to the size of the macromolecules depends on the intended length of the simulation, the desired accuracy, and the anticipated dynamics. For example, simulations of protein folding that begin from the native state may undergo smaller fluctuations, and therefore may not require as large a box, as simulations that begin from a random coil conformation. However, the effects of solvation shells on the observed dynamics – in simulation or in experiment – are not well understood. A common recommendation based on simulations of DNA is to require at least 1 nm of solvent around the molecules of interest in every dimension.

== Practical implementation: continuity and the minimum image convention ==
An object which has passed through one face of the simulation box should re-enter through the opposite face—or its image should do it. Evidently, a strategic decision must be made: Do we (A) "fold back" particles into the simulation box when they leave it, or do we (B) let them go on (but compute interactions with the nearest images)? The decision has no effect on the course of the simulation, but if the user is interested in mean displacements, diffusion lengths, etc., the second option is preferable.

=== (A) Restrict particle coordinates to the simulation box ===
To implement a PBC algorithm, at least two steps are needed.

Restricting the coordinates is a simple operation which can be described with the following code, where x_size is the length of the box in one direction (assuming an orthogonal unit cell centered on the origin) and x is the position of the particle in the same direction:

if (periodic_x) then
  if (x <  -x_size * 0.5) x = x + x_size
  if (x >=  x_size * 0.5) x = x - x_size
end if

Distance and vector between objects should obey the minimum image criterion. This can be implemented according to the following code (in the case of a one-dimensional system where dx is the distance direction vector from object i to object j):

if (periodic_x) then
  dx = x(j) - x(i)
  if (dx >   x_size * 0.5) dx = dx - x_size
  if (dx <= -x_size * 0.5) dx = dx + x_size
end if

For three-dimensional PBCs, both operations should be repeated in all 3 dimensions.

These operations can be written in a much more compact form for orthorhombic cells if the origin is shifted to a corner of the box. Then we have, in one dimension, for positions and distances respectively:

! After x(i) update without regard to PBC:
x(i) = x(i) - floor(x(i) / x_size) * x_size  ! For a box with the origin at the lower left vertex
! Works for x's lying in any image.
dx = x(j) - x(i)
dx = dx - nint(dx / x_size) * x_size

=== (B) Do not restrict the particle coordinates ===
Assuming an orthorhombic simulation box with the origin at the lower left forward corner, the minimum image convention for the calculation of effective particle distances can be calculated with the "nearest integer" function as shown above, here as C/C++ code:

x_rsize = 1.0 / x_size; // compute only when box size is set or changed

dx = x[j] - x[i];
dx -= x_size * nearbyint(dx * x_rsize);

The fastest way of carrying out this operation depends on the processor architecture. If the sign of dx is not relevant, the method

dx = fabs(dx);
dx -= static_cast<int>(dx * x_rsize +  0.5) * x_size;

was found to be fastest on x86-64 processors in 2013.

For non-orthorhombic cells the situation is more complicated.

In simulations of ionic systems more complicated operations may be needed to handle the long-range Coulomb interactions spanning several box images, for instance Ewald summation.

== Unit cell geometries ==
PBC requires the unit cell to be a shape that will tile perfectly into a three-dimensional crystal. Thus, a spherical or elliptical droplet cannot be used. A cube or rectangular prism is the most intuitive and common choice, but can be computationally expensive due to unnecessary amounts of solvent molecules in the corners, distant from the central macromolecules. A common alternative that requires less volume is the truncated octahedron.

=== General dimension ===
For simulations in 2D and 3D space, cubic periodic boundary condition is most commonly used since it is simplest in coding. In computer simulation of high dimensional systems, however, the hypercubic periodic boundary condition can be less efficient because corners occupy most part of the space. In general dimension, unit cell can be viewed as the Wigner-Seitz cell of certain lattice packing. For example, the hypercubic periodic boundary condition corresponds to the hypercubic lattice packing. It is then preferred to choose a unit cell which corresponds to the dense packing of that dimension. In 4D this is D4 lattice; and E8 lattice in 8-dimension. The implementation of these high dimensional periodic boundary conditions is equivalent to error correction code approaches in information theory.

== Conserved properties ==
Under periodic boundary conditions, the linear momentum of a system is conserved, but angular momentum is not. The conventional explanation of this is based on Noether's theorem, which says that conservation of angular momentum follows from rotational invariance of Lagrangian. But this approach has been shown to be inconsistent: it fails to explain the absence of conservation of angular momentum of a single particle moving in a periodic cell. Lagrangian of the particle is constant and therefore rotationally invariant, but its angular momentum is not conserved. This is because Noether's theorem is usually formulated for closed systems. The periodic cell exchanges mass momentum, angular momentum, and energy with the neighboring cells.

When applied to the microcanonical ensemble (constant particle number, volume, and energy, abbreviated NVE), using PBC rather than reflecting walls slightly alters the sampling of the simulation due to the conservation of total linear momentum and the position of the center of mass; this ensemble has been termed the "molecular dynamics ensemble" or the NVEPG ensemble. These additional conserved quantities introduce minor artifacts related to the statistical mechanical definition of temperature, the departure of the velocity distributions from a Boltzmann distribution, and violations of equipartition for systems containing particles with heterogeneous masses. The simplest of these effects is that a system of N particles will behave, in the molecular dynamics ensemble, as a system of N-1 particles. These artifacts have quantifiable consequences for small toy systems containing only perfectly hard particles; they have not been studied in depth for standard biomolecular simulations, but given the size of such systems, the effects will be largely negligible.

== See also ==
- Born–von Karman boundary condition
- Helical boundary conditions
- Molecular modeling
- Software for molecular mechanics modeling
