= Einstein solid =

Model of a crystalline solid

The Einstein solid is a model of a crystalline solid that contains a large number of independent three-dimensional quantum harmonic oscillators of the same frequency. The independence assumption is relaxed in the Debye model.

While the model provides qualitative agreement with experimental data, especially for the high-temperature limit, these oscillations are in fact phonons, or collective modes involving many atoms. Albert Einstein was aware that getting the frequency of the actual oscillations would be difficult, but he nevertheless proposed this theory because it was a particularly clear demonstration that quantum mechanics could solve the specific heat problem in classical mechanics.

== Historical impact ==
The original theory proposed by Einstein in 1907 has great historical relevance. The heat capacity of solids as predicted by the empirical Dulong–Petit law was required by classical mechanics, stating that the specific heat of solids should be independent of temperature. But experiments at low temperatures showed that the heat capacity changes, going to zero at absolute zero. As the temperature goes up, the specific heat goes up until it approaches the Dulong and Petit prediction at high temperature.

By employing Planck's quantization assumption, Einstein's theory accounted for the observed experimental trend for the first time. Together with the photoelectric effect, this became one of the most important pieces of evidence for the need of quantization. Einstein used the levels of the quantum mechanical oscillator many years before the advent of modern quantum mechanics.

== Heat capacity ==
For a thermodynamic approach, the heat capacity can be derived using different statistical ensembles. All solutions are equivalent at the thermodynamic limit.

=== Microcanonical ensemble ===
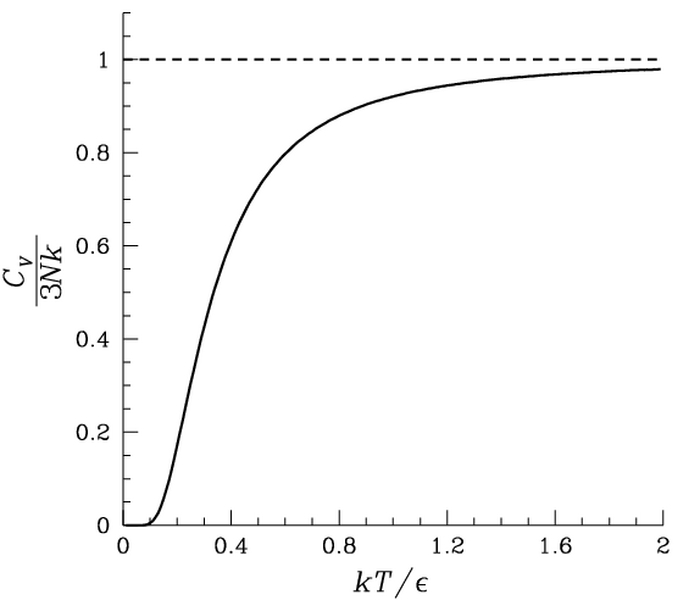
Heat capacity of an Einstein solid as a function of temperature. Experimental value of 3Nk is recovered at high temperatures.

The heat capacity of an object at constant volume V is defined through the internal energy U as

$$C_V = \left(\frac{\partial U}{\partial T}\right)_V.$$

$T$, the temperature of the system, can be found from the entropy

$$\frac{1}{T} = \frac{\partial S}{\partial U}.$$

To find the entropy consider a solid made of $N$ atoms, each of which has 3 degrees of freedom. So there are $3N$ quantum harmonic oscillators (hereafter SHOs for "Simple Harmonic Oscillators").

$$N^{\prime} = 3N$$

Possible energies of an SHO are given by

$$E_n = \hbar\omega\left(n+{1\over2}\right)$$

where the n of SHO is usually interpreted as the excitation state of the oscillating mass but here n is usually interpreted as the number of phonons (bosons) occupying that vibrational mode (frequency). The net effect is that the energy levels are evenly spaced, and one can define a quantum of energy due to a phonon as

$$\varepsilon = \hbar\omega$$

which is the smallest and only amount by which the energy of an SHO is increased. Next, we must compute the multiplicity of the system. That is, compute the number of ways to distribute $q$ quanta of energy among $N^{\prime}$ SHOs. This task becomes simpler if one thinks of distributing $q$ pebbles over $N^{\prime}$ boxes

or separating stacks of pebbles with $N' - 1$ partitions

or arranging $q$ pebbles and $N' - 1$ partitions

The last picture is the most telling. The number of arrangements of $n$ objects is $n!$. So the number of possible arrangements of $q$ pebbles and $N'-1$ partitions is $\left(q + N' - 1\right)!$. However, if partition #3 and partition #5 trade places, no one would notice. The same argument goes for quanta. To obtain the number of possible distinguishable arrangements one has to divide the total number of arrangements by the number of indistinguishable arrangements. There are $q!$ identical quanta arrangements, and $(N'-1)!$ identical partition arrangements. Therefore, multiplicity of the system is given by

$$\Omega = {\left(q+N^{\prime}-1\right)!\over q! (N^{\prime}-1)!}$$

which, as mentioned before, is the number of ways to deposit $q$ quanta of energy into $N^{\prime}$ oscillators. Entropy of the system has the form

$$S/k = \ln\Omega = \ln{\left(q+N^{\prime}-1\right)!\over q! (N^{\prime}-1)!}.$$

$N^{\prime}$ is a huge number—subtracting one from it has no overall effect whatsoever:

$$S/k \approx \ln{\left(q+N^{\prime}\right)!\over q! N^{\prime}!}$$

With the help of Stirling's approximation, entropy can be simplified:

$$S/k \approx \left(q+N^{\prime}\right)\ln\left(q+N^{\prime}\right)-N^{\prime}\ln N^{\prime}-q\ln q.$$

Total energy of the solid is given by

$$U = {N^{\prime}\varepsilon\over2} + q\varepsilon,$$

since there are q energy quanta in total in the system in addition to the ground state energy of each oscillator. Some authors, such as Schroeder, omit this ground state energy in their definition of the total energy of an Einstein solid.

We are now ready to compute the temperature

$$\frac{1}{T} = \frac{\partial S}{\partial U} = \frac{\partial S}{\partial q} \frac{dq}{dU} = \frac{1}{\varepsilon} \frac{\partial S}{\partial q} = \frac{k}{\varepsilon} \ln\left(1 + N'/q\right)$$

Elimination of q between the two preceding formulas gives for U:

$$U = {N^{\prime}\varepsilon\over2} + {N^{\prime}\varepsilon\over e^{\varepsilon/kT}-1}.$$

The first term is associated with zero point energy and does not contribute to specific heat. It will therefore be lost in the next step.

Differentiating with respect to temperature to find $C_V$ we obtain:

$$C_V = {\partial U\over\partial T} = {N^{\prime}\varepsilon^2\over k T^2}{e^{\varepsilon/kT}\over \left(e^{\varepsilon/kT}-1\right)^2}$$

or

$$C_V = 3Nk\left({\varepsilon\over k T}\right)^2{e^{\varepsilon/kT}\over \left(e^{\varepsilon/kT}-1\right)^2}.$$

Although the Einstein model of the solid predicts the heat capacity accurately at high temperatures, and in this limit

$\lim_{T\to\infty} C_V = 3Nk$, which is equivalent to Dulong–Petit law, the heat capacity noticeably deviates from experimental values at low temperatures. See Debye model for how to calculate accurate low-temperature heat capacities.

=== Canonical ensemble ===
Heat capacity is obtained through the use of the canonical partition function of a simple quantum harmonic oscillator.

$$Z = \sum_{n = 0}^{\infty} e^{-E_n/kT}$$

where

$$E_n = \varepsilon\left(n+{1\over2}\right)$$

substituting this into the partition function formula yields

$$\begin{align}
Z &= \sum_{n=0}^{\infty} e^{-\varepsilon\left(n+1/2\right)/kT}
= e^{-\varepsilon/2kT} \sum_{n=0}^{\infty} e^{-n\varepsilon/kT} \\[1ex]
&= e^{-\varepsilon/2kT} \sum_{n=0}^{\infty} \left(e^{-\varepsilon/kT}\right)^n
= {e^{-\varepsilon/2kT}\over 1-e^{-\varepsilon/kT}} \\[1ex]
&= {1\over e^{\varepsilon/2kT}-e^{-\varepsilon/2kT}}
= {1\over 2 \sinh\left({\varepsilon\over 2kT}\right)}.
\end{align}$$

This is the partition function of one harmonic oscillator. Because, statistically, heat capacity, energy, and entropy of the solid are equally distributed among its atoms, we can work with this partition function to obtain those quantities and then simply multiply them by $N^{\prime}$ to get the total. Next, let's compute the average energy of each oscillator

$$\langle E\rangle = U = -{1\over Z}\partial_{\beta}Z$$

where

$$\beta = \frac{1}{kT}.$$

Therefore,

$$U = -2 \sinh\left({\varepsilon\over 2kT}\right){-\cosh\left({\varepsilon\over 2kT}\right)\over 2 \sinh^2\left({\varepsilon\over 2kT}\right)}{\varepsilon\over2} = {\varepsilon\over2}\coth\left({\varepsilon\over 2kT}\right).$$

Heat capacity of one oscillator is then

$$c_V = {\partial U\over\partial T} = -{\varepsilon\over2} {1\over \sinh^2\left({\varepsilon\over 2kT}\right)}\left(-{\varepsilon\over 2kT^2}\right) = k \left({\varepsilon\over 2 k T}\right)^2 {1\over \sinh^2\left({\varepsilon\over 2kT}\right)}.$$

Up to now, we calculated the heat capacity of a unique degree of freedom, which has been modeled as a quantum harmonic. The heat capacity of the entire solid is then given by $C_V = 3Nc_V$, where the total number of degree of freedom of the solid is three (for the three directional degree of freedom) times $N$, the number of atoms in the solid. One thus obtains

$$C_V = 3Nk\left({\varepsilon\over 2 k T}\right)^2 {1\over \sinh^2\left({\varepsilon\over 2kT}\right)}.$$

which is algebraically identical to the formula derived in the previous section.

The quantity $T_{\rm E}=\varepsilon / k$ has the dimensions of temperature and is a characteristic property of a crystal. It is known as the Einstein temperature. Hence, the Einstein crystal model predicts that the energy and heat capacities of a crystal are universal functions of the dimensionless ratio $T / T_{\rm E}$. Similarly, the Debye model predicts a universal function of the ratio $T/T_{\rm D}$, where $T_{\rm D}$ is the Debye temperature.

== Limitations and succeeding model ==
In Einstein's model, the specific heat approaches zero exponentially fast at low temperatures. This is because all the oscillations have one common frequency. The correct behavior is found by quantizing the normal modes of the solid in the same way that Einstein suggested. Then the frequencies of the waves are not all the same, and the specific heat goes to zero as a $T^3$ power law, which matches experiment. This modification is called the Debye model, which appeared in 1912.

== See also ==
- Kinetic theory of solids
