= Peter Debye =

Dutch-American physical chemist (1884–1966)

Peter Debye ForMemRS
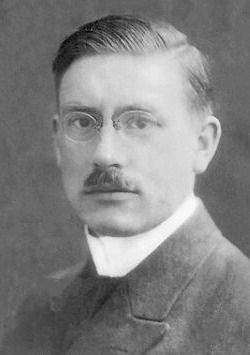
- Debye in 1912
- Born: Petrus Josephus Wilhelmus Debije; March 24, 1884; Maastricht, Netherlands
- Died: November 2, 1966 (aged 82); Ithaca, New York, U.S.
- Citizenship: Netherlands; United States
- Education: RWTH Aachen; Ludwig-Maximilians-Universität München
- Known for: Debye model; Debye relaxation; Debye frequency
- Spouse: Mathilde Alberer (m. 1913)
- Children: 2
- Awards: Rumford Medal (1930); Faraday Lectureship Prize (1933); Lorentz Medal (1935); Nobel Prize in Chemistry (1936); Willard Gibbs Award (1949); Max Planck Medal (1950); William H. Nichols Medal (1961); Priestley Medal (1963); National Medal of Science (1965)
- Scientific career
- Fields: Physics; chemistry
- Workplaces: University of Zurich (1911–12); University of Utrecht (1912–14); University of Göttingen (1914–20); ETH Zurich (1920–27); Leipzig University (1927–34); University of Berlin (1934–39); Cornell University (1940–50)
- Doctoral advisor: Arnold Sommerfeld
- Doctoral students: Lars Onsager; Paul Scherrer; George K. Fraenkel; Fritz Zwicky; Luise Lange

Signature
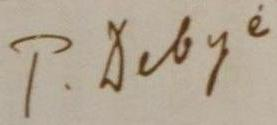

Peter Joseph William Debye (/dɪˈbaɪ/ dib-EYE; born Petrus Josephus Wilhelmus Debije, (Note: For Dutch use of "y" and "ij", see IJ (digraph).) Dutch: [ˈpeːtrʏz dəˈbɛiə]; March 24, 1884 – November 2, 1966) was a Dutch-American physicist and physical chemist, and Nobel laureate in Chemistry.

== Biography ==
=== Early life ===
Born in Maastricht, Netherlands, Debye enrolled in the Aachen University of Technology in 1901. In 1905, he completed his first degree in electrical engineering. He published his first paper, a mathematically elegant solution of a problem involving eddy currents, in 1907. At Aachen, he studied under the theoretical physicist Arnold Sommerfeld, who later claimed that his most important discovery was Peter Debye.

In 1906, Sommerfeld received an appointment at the Ludwig-Maximilians-Universität München, Bavaria, and took Debye with him as his assistant. Debye got his Ph.D. with a dissertation on radiation pressure in 1908. In 1910, he derived the Planck radiation formula using a method which Max Planck agreed was simpler than his own.

In 1911, when Albert Einstein took an appointment as a professor at Prague, Bohemia, Debye took his old professorship at the University of Zurich, Switzerland. This was followed by moves to Utrecht in 1912, to Göttingen in 1913, to ETH Zurich in 1920, to University of Leipzig in 1927, and in 1934 to Berlin, where, succeeding Einstein, he became director of the Kaiser Wilhelm Institute for Physics (now named the Max-Planck-Institut) whose facilities were built only during Debye's era. He was awarded the Lorentz Medal in 1935. From 1937 to 1939 he was the president of the Deutsche Physikalische Gesellschaft.

In May 1914 he became member of the Royal Netherlands Academy of Arts and Sciences and in December of the same year he became foreign member.

=== Family and personal life ===
Peter Debye was described as a martinet when it came to scientific principles, yet he was always approachable and made time for his students. His personal philosophy emphasized a fulfillment of purpose and enjoyment in one's work. Debye was an avid trout fisherman and gardener, collector of cacti, and was "always known to enjoy a nice cigar".

While in Berlin as an assistant to Arnold Sommerfeld, Debye became acquainted with Mathilde Alberer. Mathilde was the daughter of the proprietor of the boarding house in which Debye was staying. Mathilde would soon change her citizenship and in 1913, Debye married Mathilde Alberer. Debye would enjoy working in his rose garden with Mathilde Alberer late into his years. They had a son, Peter P. Debye (1916–2012), and a daughter, Mathilde Maria (1921–1991). Peter became a physicist and collaborated with Debye in some of his research, and had a son who was also a chemist.

Debye was a faithful Catholic who insisted his family go to church.

=== Scientific contributions ===
His first major scientific contribution was the application of the concept of dipole moment to the charge distribution in asymmetric molecules in 1912, developing equations relating dipole moments to temperature and dielectric constant. In consequence, the units of molecular dipole moments are termed debyes in his honor. Also in 1912, he extended Albert Einstein's theory of specific heat to lower temperatures by including contributions from low-frequency phonons. See Debye model.

In 1913, he extended Niels Bohr's theory of atomic structure, introducing elliptical orbits, a concept also introduced by Arnold Sommerfeld. In 1914–1915, Debye calculated the effect of temperature on X-ray diffraction patterns of crystalline solids with Paul Scherrer (the "Debye–Waller factor").

Under Debye supervision, Luise Lange at the University of Göttingen measured for the first time the dipolar moment of molecules in a solution in 1918.

In 1923, together with his assistant Erich Hückel, he developed an improvement of Svante Arrhenius' theory of electrical conductivity in electrolyte solutions. Although an improvement was made to the Debye–Hückel equation in 1926 by Lars Onsager, the theory is still regarded as a major forward step in our understanding of electrolytic solutions. Also in 1923, Debye developed a theory to explain the Compton effect, the shifting of the frequency of X-rays when they interact with electrons.

=== Later work ===
From 1934 to 1939 Debye was director of the physics section of the prestigious Kaiser Wilhelm Institute in Berlin. From 1936 onwards he was also professor of Theoretical Physics at the Frederick William University of Berlin. These positions were held during the Nazi regime in Germany and, from 1938 onward, Austria.

In 1939 Debye traveled to the United States to deliver the Baker Lectures at Cornell University in Ithaca, New York. After leaving Germany in early 1940, Debye became a professor at Cornell, chaired the chemistry department for 10 years, and became a member of Alpha Chi Sigma. In 1946 he became an American citizen. Unlike the European phase of his life, where he moved from city to city every few years, in the United States Debye remained at Cornell for the remainder of his career. He retired in 1952, but continued research until his death.

Much of Debye's work at Cornell concerned the use of light-scattering techniques (derived from his X-ray scattering work of years earlier) to determine the size and molecular weight of polymer molecules. This started as a result of his research during World War II on synthetic rubber, but was extended to proteins and other macromolecules.

In April 1966, Debye suffered a heart attack, and in November of that year a second one proved fatal. He is buried in the Pleasant Grove Cemetery (Ithaca, New York, US).

== War activities and controversies ==
=== 2006 controversy ===
In January 2006, a book (in Dutch) appeared in The Netherlands, written by Sybe Rispens, entitled Einstein in the Netherlands. One chapter of this book discusses the relationship between Albert Einstein and Debye. Rispens discovered documents that, as he believed, were new and proved that, during his directorship of the Kaiser Wilhelm Society, Debye was actively involved in cleansing German science institutions of Jewish and other "non-Aryan elements". Rispens records that on December 9, 1938, Debye wrote in his capacity as chairman of the Deutsche Physikalische Gesellschaft (DPG) to all the members of the DPG:

In light of the current situation, membership by German Jews as stipulated by the Nuremberg laws, of the Deutsche Physikalische Gesellschaft cannot be continued. According to the wishes of the board, I ask of all members to whom these definitions apply to report to me their resignation. Heil Hitler!

Many biographies published before Rispens' work, state that Debye moved to the US because he refused to accept German citizenship forced on to him by the Nazis. He planned his departure from Germany during a visit with his mother in Maastricht in late 1939, boarded a ship in Genoa in January 1940 and arrived in New York in early February 1940. He immediately sought a permanent position in the US and accepted such an offer from Cornell in June 1940. That month, he crossed the US border into Canada and returned within days on an immigration visa. He was able to get his wife out of Germany and to the US by December 1940. Although his son already was in the US before he departed, Peter Debye's 19-year-old daughter and his sister-in-law did not leave. They lived in his official residence in Berlin and were supported by Debye's official Berlin wages (he carefully maintained an official leave of absence for this purpose).

Further, Rispens alleges that Albert Einstein in the first half of 1940 tried to prevent Debye from being appointed in the United States at Cornell. Einstein allegedly wrote to his American colleagues: "I know from a reliable source that Peter Debye is still in close contact with the German (Nazi) leaders" and, according to Rispens, called upon his colleagues to do "what they consider their duty as American citizens". To support this, Rispens refers to a well-known letter from Debye to Einstein and Einstein's response to it. Van Ginkel investigated 1940 FBI reports on this matter and traced the "reliable source" to a single letter directed to Einstein and written by someone whose name is lost. This person was not known personally to Einstein and, according to Einstein, probably did not know Debye personally either. Moreover, this accusatory letter did not reach Einstein directly but was intercepted by British censors who showed it to Einstein. Einstein sent the British agent with the letter to Cornell, and the Cornell authorities told Debye about the affair. Thereupon Debye wrote his well-known 1940 letter to Einstein to which Einstein answered. The latter two letters can be found in the published Einstein correspondence.

Rispens alleges that Debye sent a telegram to Berlin on 23 June 1941 informing his previous employers that he was able and willing to resume his responsibilities at the Kaiser Wilhelm Institut, presumably to maintain his leave of absence and keep the Berlin house and wages available for his daughter. A copy of this telegram has not been recovered thus far. In summer 1941, Debye filed his intent to become a US citizen and was quickly recruited in the US to participate in Allied war research.

It has been well documented in many biographies, and also in Rispens' book, that Debye and Dutch colleagues helped his Jewish colleague Lise Meitner in 1938–1939 (at great risk to himself and his family) cross the Dutch-German border to escape Nazi persecution and eventually obtain a position in Sweden.

Predating Rispens' work, and in contrast to it, an article by Rechenberg appeared 18 years earlier concerning Debye's letter. The article describes Debye's missive in more detail and presents a very favorable picture of Debye in his efforts to resist Nazi activists. Moreover, this article points out that Max von Laue, well known for his anti-Nazi views, gave his approval to the letter from the DPG chairman.

=== International response ===
Debye's son, Peter P. Debye, interviewed in 2006 at age 89 recollects that his father was completely apolitical and that in the privacy of their home politics were never discussed. According to his son, Debye just wanted to do his job at the Kaiser Wilhelm Institute and as long as the Nazis did not bother him was able to do so. He recalls that his mother urged him (the son) to stay in the US in the event of war. Debye's son had come to the US on a planned 2-month vacation during the summer of 1939 and never returned to Germany because war broke out.

In an opinion article published on the Debye Institute website, Dr. Gijs van Ginkel, until April 2007 Senior Managing Director of the VM Debye Instituut in Utrecht deplored the decision to rename the institute. In his article he cites scholars who point out that the DPG was able to retain their threatened staff as long as could be expected under increasing pressure from the Nazis. He also puts forward the important argument that when Debye in 1950 received the Max Planck medal of the DPG, nobody objected, not even the known opponent of the national socialists Max von Laue, who would have been in a position to object. Also Einstein, with his enormous prestige, was still alive, as were other Jewish scientists such as Lise Meitner and James Franck who both knew Debye intimately. None of them protested against Debye's receiving the highest German scientific distinction. In fact, Albert Einstein, after many years of not participating in the voting for the Max Planck Medal nominees, joined the process again to vote for Debye.

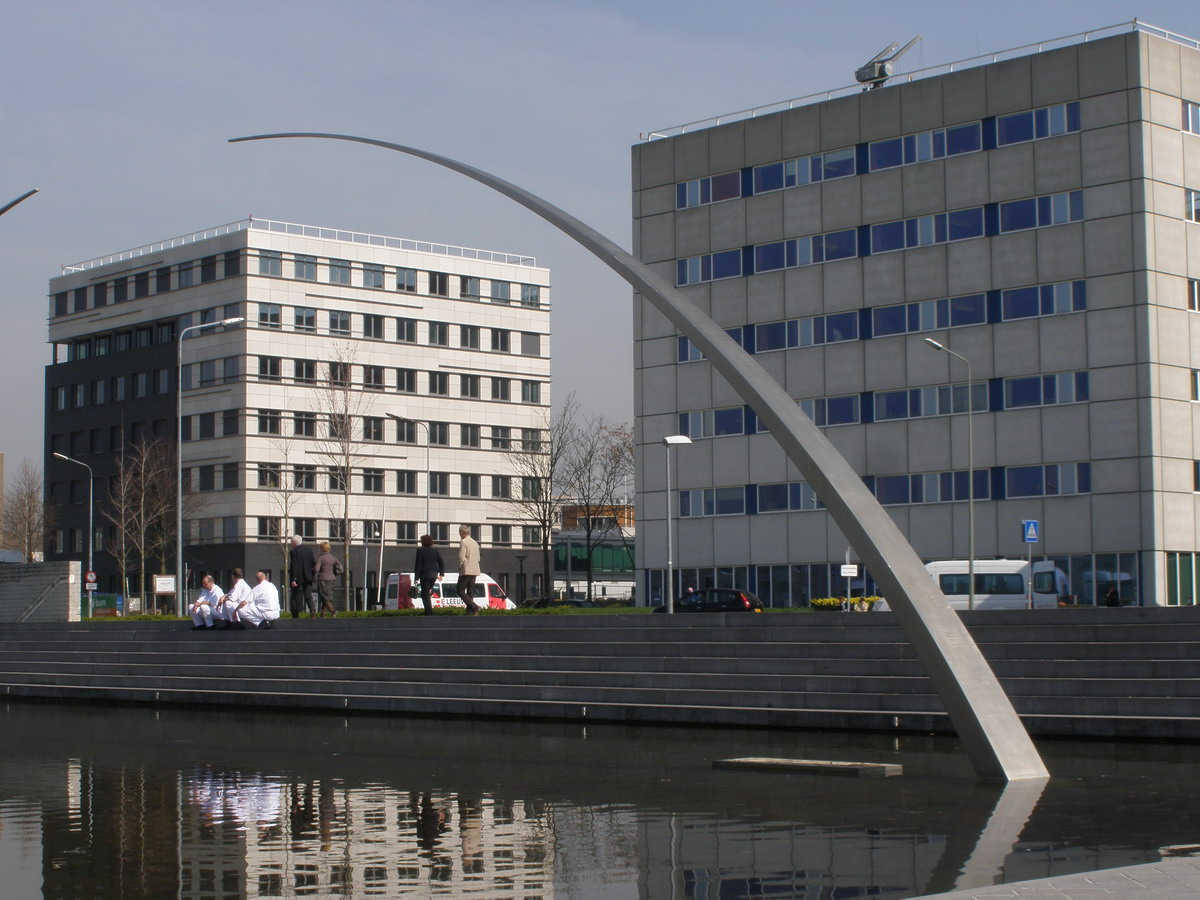
Monument for Peter Debye in the Maastricht square that bears his name: Dipole moments (Felix van de Beek, 1998)

Maastricht University also announced that it was reconsidering its position on the Peter Debye Prijs voor natuurwetenschappelijk onderzoek (Peter Debye Prize for scientific research).

In a reply on the DPG website, Dieter Hoffmann and Mark Walker also conclude that Debye was not a Nazi activist. They remark that Max von Laue also was required and obliged (as a civil servant) to sign letters with Heil Hitler. They also state that the DPG was one of the last scientific societies to purge the Jewish members and only very reluctantly. They quote the response of the Reich University Teachers League (a National Socialist organization) to the Debye letter:

"Obviously the German Physical Society is still very backward and still clings tightly to their dear Jews. It is in fact remarkable that only "because of circumstances beyond our control" the membership of Jews can no longer be maintained"

In May 2006, the Dutch Nobel Prize winner Martinus Veltman who had written the foreword to the Rispen book, renounced the book's description of Peter Debye, withdrew his foreword, and asked the Board of Directors of Utrecht University to rescind their decision to rename the Debye Institute.

Various historical investigations, both in The Netherlands and in the US, have been carried out subsequent to the actions of the University of Maastricht. The earliest of these investigations, carried out by the Cornell University's department of Chemistry and Chemical Biology released a report on 31 May 2006, which states that:

Based on the information to-date, we have not found evidence supporting the accusations that Debye was a Nazi sympathizer or collaborator or that he held anti-Semitic views. It is important that this be stated clearly since these are the most serious allegations.

It goes on to declare:

Thus, based on the information, evidence and historical record known to date, we believe that any action that dissociates Debye's name from the Department of Chemistry and Chemical Biology at Cornell is unwarranted.

In June 2006, it was reported that the scientific director of the (formerly) Debye Institute had been reprimanded by the board of directors of the University of Utrecht for a new publication on Debye's war years on the grounds that it was too personally biased with respect to the Institute's naming dispute. According to the board, the book should have been published not as a Debye Institute publication, but as a personal one. The book was banned by the University of Utrecht and both Directors of the (former) Debye Institute were forbidden to have any further contact with the press. A dozen professors of the Physics Faculty, amongst whom Cees Andriesse, openly protested against the interventions of the Board and the censorship of their protest by the university.

In May 2007, the universities of Utrecht and Maastricht announced that a new committee headed by Jan Terlouw would advise them regarding the name change. Also, in the beginning of 2007 an official report was announced, to be published by the NIOD and authorized by the Dutch Education Ministry (then scheduled for fall 2007).

=== 2007 NIOD report ===
The report describes Rispens' presentation of Debye, as an opportunist who had no objection to the Nazis, as a caricature.

[I]t can be stated that Debye was rightly called an opportunist after his arrival in the United States. We have seen that he showed himself to be loyal to the dominant political system, first in the Third Reich and then in the United States, while at the same time keeping the back door open: in the Third Reich by retaining his Dutch nationality, in the United States by attempting to secretly maintain some contacts with Nazi Germany via the Foreign Office.

It concludes that Debye's actions in 1933–45 were based on the nineteenth-century positivist view of science which saw research in physics as generating blessings for humankind. The report states that, by his contemporaries, Debye was considered an opportunist by some and as a man of highest character by others. The report asserts that Debye was not coerced by the Nazis into writing the infamous DPG Heil Hitler letter and that he also did not follow the lead of other societies in doing so but, rather, other societies followed his lead. The NIOD report also concludes that Debye felt obliged to send the letter and that it was, for him, simply a confirmation of an existing situation. The report argues that Debye, in the Third Reich, developed a survival method of ambiguity which allowed him to pursue his scientific career despite the political turmoil. Crucial to this survival method was the need to keep ready an escape hatch, for example in his secret dealings with the Nazis in 1941, if needed.

Yet, the report also states that the picture of Debye should not be oversimplified as Debye's actions were also motivated by his loyalty to his daughter, who had remained in Berlin. In general, Debye developed a survival method of ambiguity, that "could pull the wool over people's eyes".

=== 2008 Terlouw report ===
In January 2008 the Terlouw Commission advised the Boards of Utrecht and Maastricht Universities to continue to use Peter Debye's name for the chemistry and physics institute in Utrecht, and to continue awarding the science prize in Maastricht. The Commission concluded that Debye was not a party member, was not an anti-semite, did not further Nazi propaganda, did not cooperate with the Nazi war machine, was not a collaborator, and yet also was not a resistance hero. He was a rather pragmatic, flexible, and brilliant scientist, idealistic with respect to the pursuit of science, but only superficially oriented in politics. With respect to sending out the DPG letter, the Commission concluded that Debye found the situation inescapable. The Commission pointed out that the Royal Dutch Academy of Sciences also took away Albert Einstein's honorary membership, emphasizing the circumstances in which these decisions had been taken. The Commission stated that now, seventy years later, no judgment can be made concerning the decision of Debye to sign this letter in the exceptionally difficult circumstances in which he then found himself. Nevertheless, the Commission describes the DPG letter as an extraordinarily unpleasant fact, forming a dark page in his life history. Finally, the Commission concluded that based on the NIOD report since no bad faith on Debye's part has been demonstrated, his good faith must be assumed and recommended that the University of Utrecht retain the name of the Debye Institute of NanoMaterials Science and that the University of Maastricht continue to associate itself with the Peter Debye Prize. Utrecht University accepted the recommendation, Maastricht University did not. But in February 2008, the Hustinx Foundation (Maastricht), originator and sponsor of the Peter Debye Prize, announced that it will continue to have the prize awarded. The City of Maastricht, Debye's birthplace, declared that it sees no reason to change the names of Debye Street and Debye Square.

=== Debye the spy ===
In a 2010 publication Jurrie Reiding asserts that Debye may have been an MI6 spy. Reiding discovered that Debye was befriended by the well-documented spy Paul Rosbaud. They first met around 1930 when they were both working as editors for two scientific journals. They collaborated in the escape of Lise Meitner in 1938. According to Reiding, Debye was well connected in German scientific and industrial circles and could have provided MI6 with valuable information. For example, as board member of the German Academy for Aviation Research he was acquainted with Hermann Göring. Reiding also offers an explanation for Debye's hasty departure on 16 January 1940 for the United States: the date coincided with the planned (but later delayed) German invasion of the Netherlands a day later, information possibly provided to him by Rosbaud.

This hypothesis is contested by Philip Ball, as he notes that friendship with Rosbaud is no gauge of Debye's political stance. Rosbaud was well-connected with many people and Debye, while he was a friend of Rosbaud's, seems to have also felt regard for geologist Friedrich Drescher-Kaden, an ardent Nazi.

== Awards and honors ==
- 1927 – elected International Honorary Member of the American Academy of Arts and Sciences
- 1930 – Rumford Medal for work relating to specific heats and X-ray spectroscopy
- 1936 – Nobel Prize in Chemistry "for his contributions to the study of molecular structure," primarily referring to his work on dipole moments and X-ray diffraction
- 1936 – elected member of the American Philosophical Society
- 1937 – Franklin Medal from The Franklin Institute
- 1947 – elected member of the United States National Academy of Sciences
- 1963 – Priestley Medal
- 1965 – National Medal of Science
- 1982 – Alpha Chi Sigma Hall of Fame

== Eponyms ==
- Debye shielding – In plasmas, semiconductors and electrolytes, the process by which a fixed electric charge is shielded by redistributing mobile charged particles around it.
- Debye length – The typical distance in a plasma required for full Debye shielding.
- Debye model – A model of the heat capacity of solids as a function of temperature
- Debye – a unit of electric dipole moment
- Debye frequency – a characteristic vibrational frequency of a crystalline lattice.
- Debye relaxation – The dielectric relaxation response of an ideal, noninteracting population of dipoles to an alternating external electric field.
- Debye sheath – The non-neutral layer, several Debye lengths thick, where a plasma contacts a material surface.
- Debye–Hückel equation – A method of calculating activity coefficients
- Debye function – A function used in the calculation of heat capacity.
- Debye–Scherrer method – A technique used in X-ray powder diffraction.
- Debye–Waller factor – A measure of disorder in a crystal lattice.
- 30852 Debye – A minor planet (originally named 1991 TR6).
- Lorenz–Mie–Debye theory Theory of light scattering by a spherical particle.
- Debye (crater) – A lunar crater located on the far side and in the northern hemisphere of the moon.

== See also ==
- Electroacoustic phenomena
- Ion vibration current
- Magnetic refrigeration
- Method of steepest descent
- Rotational Brownian motion
